= Water conflict in the Middle East and North Africa =

Water conflict in the MENA

Water conflict in the Middle East and North Africa (MENA) primarily deals with three major river basins: the Jordan River Basin, the Tigris-Euphrates River Basin, and the Nile River Basin. The MENA region covers roughly 11.1 million square km. There are three major deserts in the MENA region:

- The Sahara Desert, comprising large sections of North Africa.
- Rub' al Khali, in the southern Arabian Peninsula.
- Badiat El-Sham, in the northern Arabian Peninsula.

Additionally, much of Iran is covered in desert. Average annual rainfall is less than 100 mm in 65% of the region, between 100 and 300 mm in 15% of the region, and more than 300mm in the remaining region. The conditions that create conflict are only expected to get worse and more complicated, as the full impacts of climate change on the Middle East and North Africa develop over the course of the 21st century.

== Jordan River Basin ==
=== Water resources ===
Satellite map of the Middle East.

The three headwaters of the Jordan River – the Hasbani River (annual stable flow of 250 Mm^{3}), the Banias River (annual stable flow of 125 Mm^{3}), and the Dan River (annual stable flow of 250 Mm^{3}) originate in Lebanon, Syria, and Israel, respectively. They merge in Lake Huleh and then flow south as the Jordan River. Just south of Tiberias, the Yarmuk River joins the Jordan River. In total, the Jordan River flows for roughly 350 km, starting in the foothills of Mount Hermon in the north and ending in the Dead Sea to the south. The River has an estimated flow of 1880 MCM/Y, 73 percent of which originates in Arab countries and 27 percent of which originates in Israel. According to a September 2000 USAF study, over 90% of Syria’s water is shared with neighboring Iraq, Turkey, Israel, Lebanon, and Jordan. Approximately 36 percent of Jordan’s water sources are shared with Syria, the West Bank, and Israel, and more than half of Israel’s waters is shared with Syria, Lebanon, Jordan, and the West Bank.

Further north, the Litani River and Orontes River comprise the northern Levant watershed. Although their headwaters are geographically close, the Litani flows south then west to the Mediterranean near Tyre, crossing through Lebanon alone, while the Orontes flows north into Syria, entering the Mediterranean around the city of Antioch. The Litani's estimated annual flow of 410 MCM/Y has been the target of proposed Syrian, Jordanian, and Israeli water solutions.

Syria, Lebanon, and Israel all have indigenous underground freshwater aquifers. There are two main underground aquifers that provide fresh water to modern-day Israel. The Mountain Aquifer is underneath the West Bank. It recharges 679 Mm^{3} of water annually, of which 78 Mm^{3} are brackish. The Mountain Aquifer’s three main basins are the Eastern Basin, the Western Basin, and the Northeastern Basin. The Eastern Basin is the smallest in terms of freshwater quantities but the largest in terms of area. It covers roughly 3260 km^2. The Western Basin is the largest of the three in terms of freshwater content. It covers roughly 1780 km^{2}. Finally, the Northeastern Basin has an area of roughly 610 km^{2}. The Coastal Aquifer located along the Mediterranean Coast has a total annual recharge of 330 Mm^{3}.

The area around the Jordan River Basin is one of the driest in the world. Israel and northwestern Jordan receive an average of 1190 cm of rainfall per year. Little of this water can be exploited. Only Kuwait, Libya, Oman, and Singapore receive less rain annually than Jordan or Israel. Syria and Lebanon, in contrast, receive enough rainfall to support agriculture and recharge underground aquifers. As stated earlier, while northern parts of Jordan and Israel receive 110 cm of annual rainfall, central Jordan and the West Bank receive 20 mcm/y. Only 3 mcm/y of this water is usable, however.

=== Water consumption ===
Israel uses roughly 850 MCM/Y of groundwater, 400 MCM/Y of which come from the Mountain Aquifer. In 1964, Israel began to withdraw 320 MCM/Y from the Jordan River for the National Water Carrier. By 1967, Israel’s National Water Carrier was extracting almost 70 percent of the Jordan River before it reached the Palestinians in the West Bank. In the 1980s, Israeli settlers consumed seven times more water than Arab farmers. Other sources show a smaller, yet still sizeable difference. Per a September 2000 study, Israel uses 1180 MCM/Y, or 62 percent of its total annual water supply on agriculture. In comparison, Jordan uses 67 MCM/Y, or 74 percent of its total water supply on agriculture. Roughly 48 percent of Israel’s average annual water usage of 1,950 MCM/Y comes from territory captured in 1967. 400 MCM/Y of this comes from ground water in the West Bank, while 450 MCM/Y comes from the upper Jordan River and the Golan Heights. As early as 1981, however, Israel was exploiting 99 percent of its available water resources.

=== Water Supply Systems ===
==== British Mandate Period (1917–1948) ====
At the time of the British Mandate of Palestine (1913–1948), three irrigation systems existed along the eastern slopes of the Judaean Mountains. The Wadi Qelt aqueduct provided 3 MCM/Y of fresh water to Jericho from the Ein Fara, Ein Fawar, and Ein Qelt springs. Additionally, the Wadi Uja aqueduct supplied the Uja Valley with 7 MCM/Y of fresh water from the Ein Uja spring and the Wadi Faria aqueduct transported 5 MCM/Y of water from the Ein Shibli, Ein Isca, and Ein Baidan springs to the Giftlik. Under Roman rule, the Nablus and Jerusalem aqueducts were also active in the Judea and Samaria Mountains. These aqueducts brought a combined additional 3 MCM/Y to Sabastia and Jerusalem. During the Mandate, another 200 small groundwater springs were used and rainwater was collected from cisterns, yielding an additional 5 MCM/Y of fresh water during rainy years. With the addition of two electric power plants supplying an addition 2 MCM/Y to Jerusalem and Ramallah, the maximum water capacity in the Judea and Samaria Mountains was 25 MCM/Y.

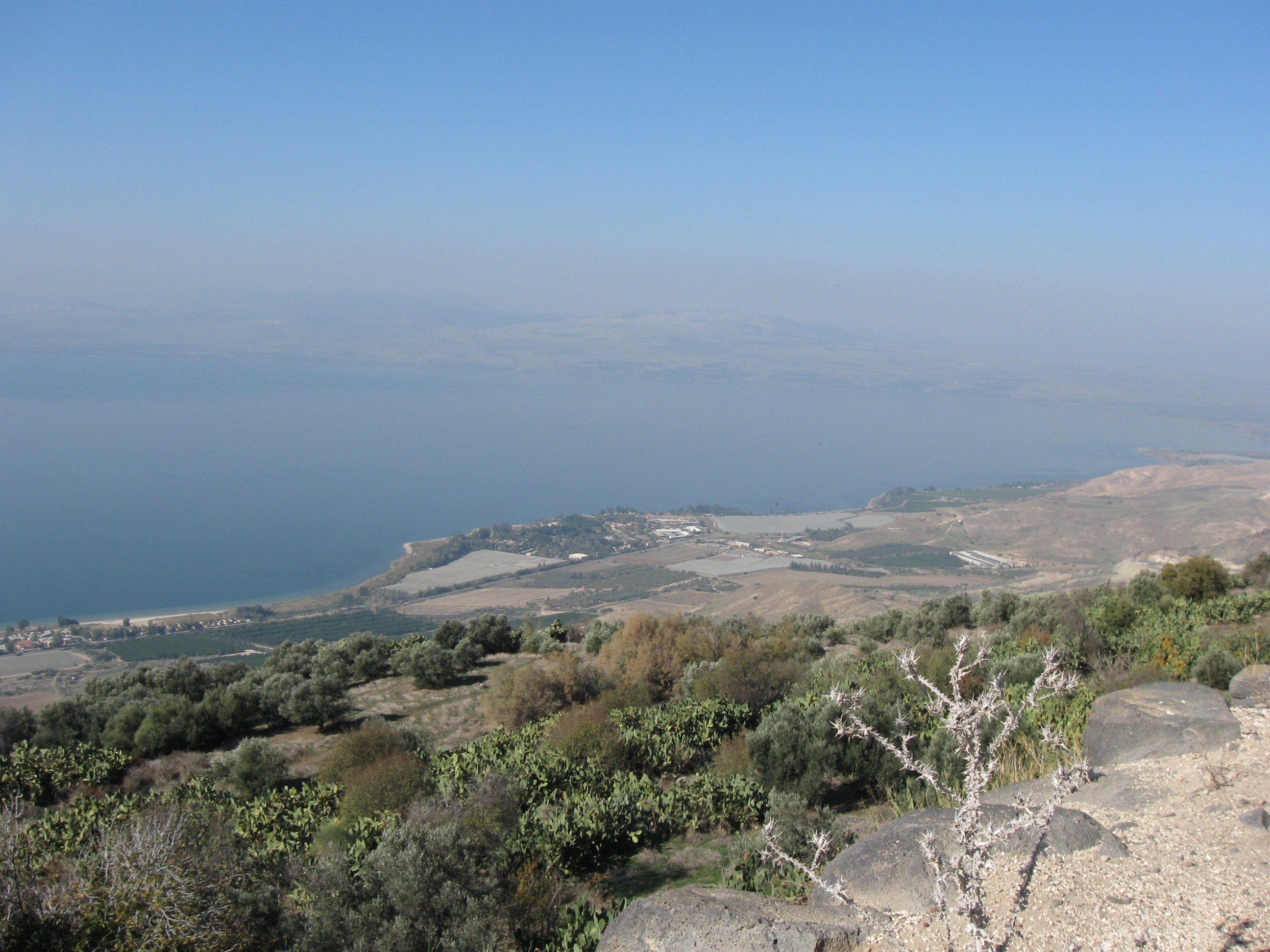
Lake Tiberias

Several plans attempted to allocate the water resources of the region during the British Mandate. The Ionides Plan of 1939 made three recommendations. First, it proposed to store the floodwaters of the Yarmouk River in Lake Tiberias (Sea of Galilea). Second, it set and amount of the water in the lake to be diverted through the East Ghor Canal and used for irrigation east of the Jordan River. Third, it limited the use of Jordan River Basin water to the Jordan River Valley. This was rejected by Zionist advocates who envisioned using waters from the Jordan River Basin to settle the Negev Desert in the south of the country. In contrast, the Lowdermilk Plan, commissioned by the United States Department of Agriculture, proposed irrigating the Jordan River Valley and diverting the Jordan and Yarmouk Rivers for hydroelectric power. In 1948, James B. Hays used the findings in Lowdermilk as a basis for the Hays Plan in which the Yarmouk River was to be diverted into Lake Tiberias to compensate for the waters lost in the diversion of the Jordan River for agricultural purposes.

==== Jordanian Rule (1948–1967) ====
In 1948 Israel officially became a state. The Kingdom of Jordan assumed control of the water resources of the Judea and Samaria Mountains. They retained control over the region until the Six-Day War in 1967. Additional wells drilled during this period and the maximum water supply in the region reached 66 MCM/Y. Only four of 708 Palestinian towns, however, were connected to the water supply at the time. In 1965 an additional 350 wells were drilled, supplying a total of 41 MCM/Y. In the 1947–1949 Palestine war ( the Jewish Army destroyed the Rutenburg electric plant in trying to prevent the exclusive Arab control of both the Jordan and Yarmouk Rivers. As a direct result the Jordanian Government and the United Nations Relief and Works Agency commission the MacDonald Plan, which resembled the Ionides Plan (1939) in limiting the waters of the Jordan River Basin to the Jordan River Valley. It also called for a diversion of the Yarmouk River for storage in Lake Tiberias to be used to support agricultural developments on both sides of the Jordan River. Jordan and Syria backed the Bunger Plan, which proposed a dam of the Yarmouk River and the creation of two hydroelectric power plants to supply electricity to Jordan and Syria. In 1953, shortly after construction had started, increased pressure from the U.S. forced Jordan and Syria to abandon their plans. The Eisenhower Administration sent Eric Johnston as a special envoy. The Johnston Plan implemented the policies of a Tennessee Valley Authority study conducted by Chales Main – the Main Plan – that included water distribution quotas of the Jordan River Basin. Although neither side accepted the plan, it has been used as the basis for many subsequent water conflict negotiations.

==== Israeli Administration (1967–present) ====
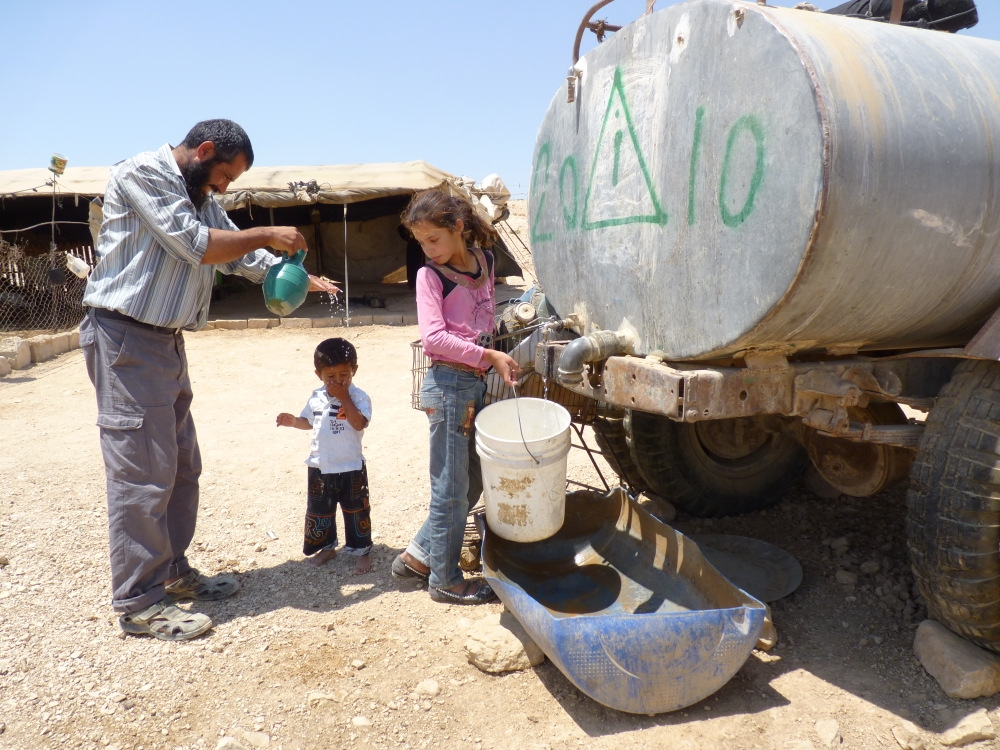
Palestinian villagers purchase water from water trucks in Khirbet A-Duqaiqah in the Hebron Hills

When Israel occupied the West Bank in the Six-Day-War 1967, the water resources of the region were declared as state property. The occupation has huge impacts on the daily lives of the Palestinian people and their water supply: In many aspects the occupation implicates breaches of international law, such as the international human rights law or the international humanitarian law. Especially the land confiscations and property demolitions by the Israeli military as well as the restrictions on the movement of people and goods are criticized. Since 1967, most water sources are controlled by the Israeli military. Moreover, water resources are diverted and the Palestinian population is denied access to most water resources. In the same time, Israel claims that the Palestinians drill unauthorized wells. Large parts of the Palestinian water infrastructure, including cisterns, wells, and irrigation systems, are declared as illegal and systematically demolished. As the development of new Palestinian water infrastructures is mostly prohibited, the Palestinian water supply systems are in a very poor condition. In that way, they are reflecting the weak and ambiguous political status of Palestine. As most people in the West Bank depend on agriculture, the Palestinian water deficit is also weakening the local economy. Thereby it is strongly contributing to poverty and unemployment. The unbalanced water allocation in the Palestinian territories shaped the term of "water apartheid".

Even though it is difficult to get accurate data, the average Israeli water consumption in the West Bank is about 6 times higher than the average Palestinian water consumption of approximately 50 liters/person/day, what is about the half of the World Health Organization minimum recommended level. However, there are other data showing a different picture. By excluding treated sewage and desalinated water and using a different type of demographic data, Gvirtzman (2012) for instance argues that the average Israeli and the average Palestinian water consumption is nowadays almost the same. The huge differences in the Israeli and Palestinian water data illustrate how contested and urgent the question of water allocation still is.

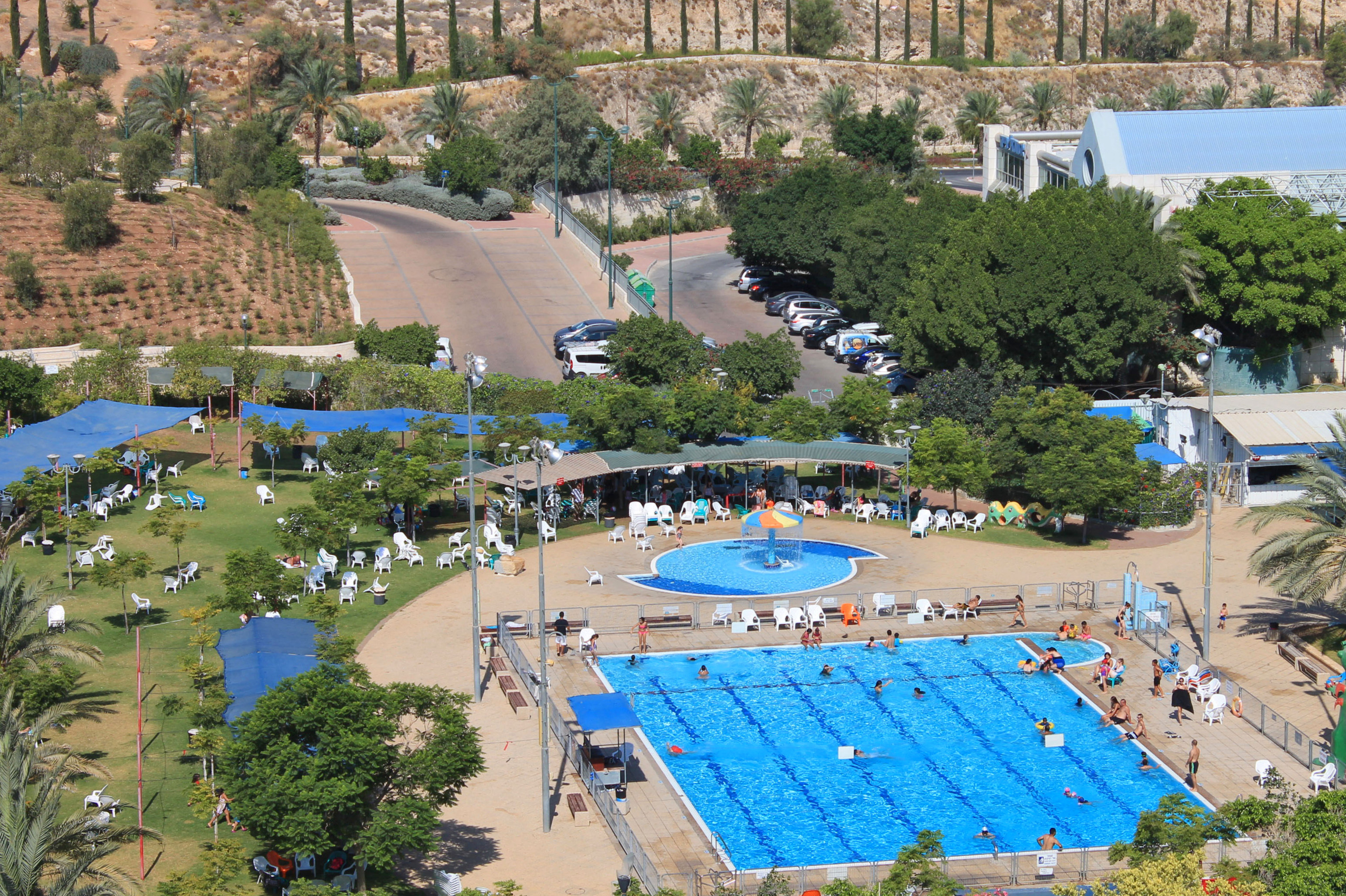
A swimming pool in the Israeli settlement of Ma'ale Adumim, West Bank

Until today, there is no final agreement granting water rights to the Palestinian population. Although water questions were a topic in the Oslo Peace Process, the water dispute was not solved through the negotiations. Indeed, Article 40 of the "Interim Agreement on the West Bank and the Gaza Strip" (1995) deals with the Palestinian water rights, but it states that "these will be negotiated in the permanent status negotiations and settled in the Permanent Status Agreement relating to the various water resources". In the meantime, "during the interim period a total quantity of 28.6 mcm/year" will be allocated to the Palestinian population "in order to meet the immediate needs [..] in fresh water for domestic use". In reality, due to the ongoing Israeli-Palestinian tensions, a Permanent Status Agreement was never negotiated. Therefore, the agreement indirectly maintained Israeli domination over water resources and handled the issue of water deficit in the occupied Palestinian territories as a matter of humanitarian need rather than a right.

Moreover, the Israeli-Palestinian Joint Water Commission (JWC) was established to implement the agreement in a collaborative way. The Hydrological, Engineering, Sewage, and Pricing Committees of the JWC meet on a regular basis to approve the construction of water supply systems or sewage installations. As a part of that agreement, Israel transferred the control of the water supply in the Palestinian territories to the Palestinian Authority. Nevertheless, the Palestinian Authority is hardly able to fulfill its responsibilities, as Israeli members of the Joint Water Commission are able to veto any Palestinian project. Furthermore, the members of the Palestinian Authority are unable to access most areas as they are denied access by the military. The result is, that more than 33% of the water supplied to the Palestinian territories "leaks from internal pipelines". Both sides contest that the laws established in Oslo are no longer being followed. As the Palestinian population is not allocated enough water, the work of the Joint Water Commission can be considered as insufficient.

== Nile River Basin ==
=== Water resources ===
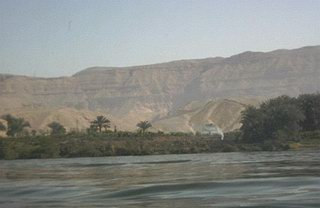
Nile River in Egypt

The Nile River is an international water basin, running through 10 different sovereign nations. The Nile runs through Sudan, South Sudan, Burundi, Rwanda, Democratic Republic of the Congo, Tanzania, Kenya, Uganda, Ethiopia, and Egypt and is considered to be the longest river in the world. The Nile is the only significant source of water in North Africa and 40% of Africa’s population lives in the Nile River Basin. The Nile has two major tributaries: the White Nile and the Blue Nile. The White Nile is the longer of the two, rising in the Great Lakes Region of central Africa. Its most distant source is unknown, located in either Burundi or Rwanda. From there, it flows through Tanzania, Lake Victoria, Uganda, and South Sudan. The Blue Nile originates from Ethiopia’s Lake Tana, flowing into Sudan from the southeast. In total, Ethiopian headwaters provides 86% of Nile River waters. The two major tributaries meet near the Sudanese capital of Khartoum and flow north through Egypt and into the Mediterranean Sea.

=== Sudanese Civil War ===
Access to key resources, mainly water, is a primary source of the Civil War in Sudan. Ecologically, Sudan is divided into a northern and southern region. The North is densely populated with Arab Muslims. Although the Nile flows through the northern part of Sudan, it is largely beyond the drainage basins of the feeder streams and rivers that consolidate themselves into the White and Blue Niles further to the south. The South is lightly populated, but much more fertile. It receives adequate rainfall and benefits from many feeder streams and springs scattered throughout the area. Persistent drought and desertification, population expansion, and the need to increase food output have forced many northern Arabs to look south for lands and resources. The introduction by the North of mechanized farming equipment continues to threaten southern subsistence farming. Organized as the Sudan People’s Liberation Army (SPLA), southerners have fought back against northern intrusion for the better part of three decades.

Water conflict in Sudan typically concerns canal building or farming projects. One of the more notable sources of conflict has been the Jonglei Canal project, begun in 1978. The project was started for two primary reasons: to drain the Sudd Swamps to create additional farmland and to conserve the water being evaporated as it sat idle in the swamps. The amount lost through evaporation was estimated at 4000 mcm/y. Both the Sudanese and Egyptian governments supported the project as both would share in the benefits of additional water. The Jonglei Canal is massive enough to be seen from space. It averages 210 feet in width and 16 feet in depth. Drainage of the wetlands threatened the roughly 1.7 million local tribesmen that depended on the swamps for survival and in November 1974, locals rioted in the southern city of Juba. Southerners began to flock to the SPLA, which led violent attacks on construction sites along the Jonglei Canal. They eventually forced the suspension of the project in 1984. 250 of 360 km of canal had been built.

The incursion of northern mechanized farming in southern Sudan has also caused conflict. The Arab-dominated government envisioned agricultural development in the South and northern farmers continually encroached upon the fertile southern plains. Such encroachment threatened the Nilotic tribes, who ran the cattle economies of the south. Southerners responded to northern incursion with hostility and violence.

Conflict again broke out between the northern government and the Sudanese people concerning the government’s decision to build the Kajbar Dam on the Nile. The resulting reservoir would have forced the relocation of the last remaining Nubian tribes in the Sudan. Much of the Nubian homeland had already been flooded after the Aswan High Dam was built by Egypt in the 1950s. Many Sudanese protested the building of the Kajbar, with members of the Nubain Alliance even threatening mass suicide in protest. They have declined offers of compensation from the Sudanese government.

=== Regional conflicts ===
Aside from a source of internal conflict within nations, water has caused external tension between sovereign states. While Egypt consumes 99% of the Nile’s water supply, little water originates within Egypt’s sovereign borders. High water demands of a lower riparian have often fueled regional conflict. Such is the case in North Africa.

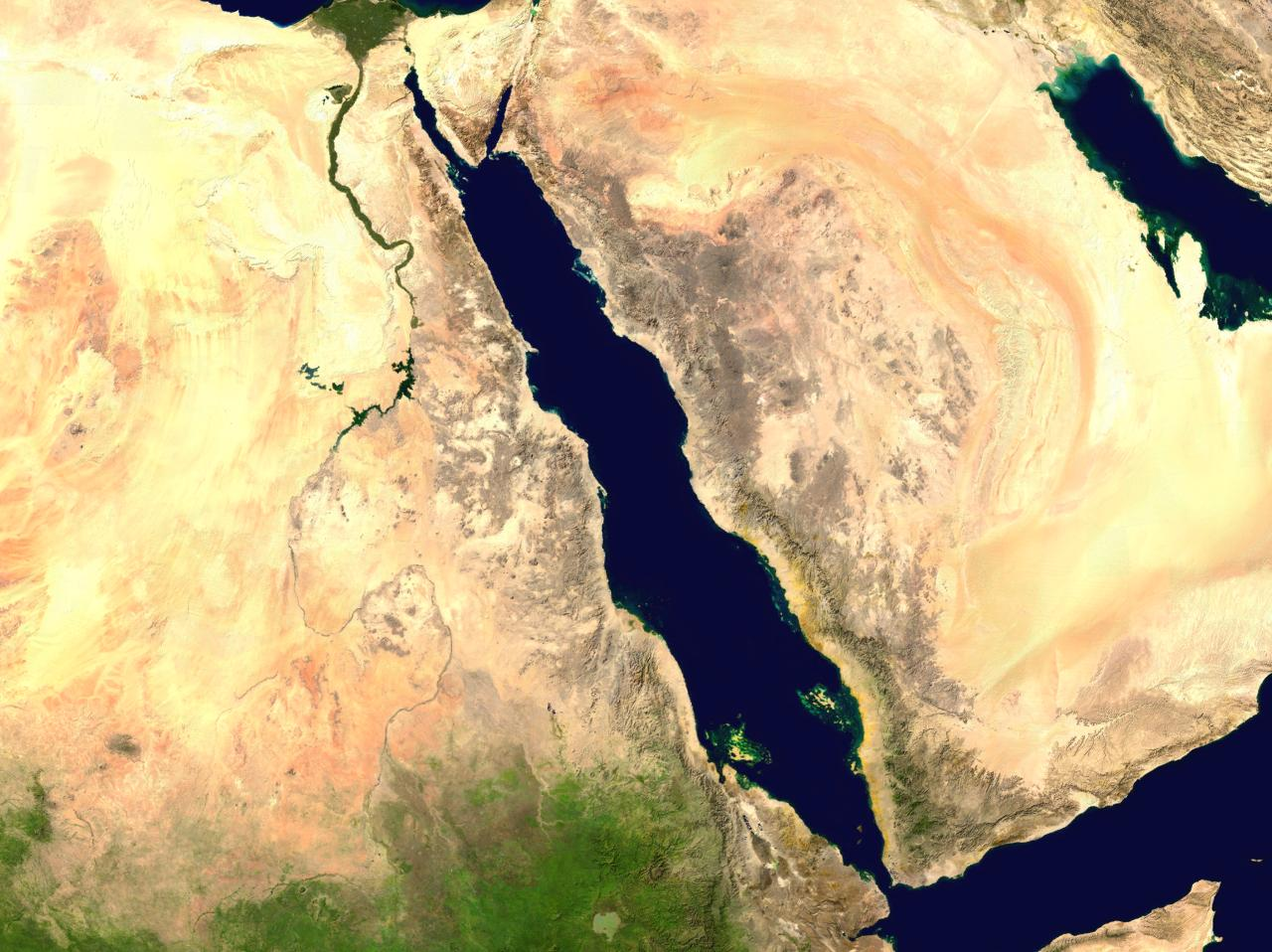
Northeast Africa, the Red Sea, the Arabian Peninsula and the Sinai Peninsula

In the early 1900s, a world cotton shortage put pressure on Egypt and Sudan to use arable lands to increase cotton production. Cotton, however, requires extensive irrigation and is less suitable to Egyptian and Sudanese climate than are other more traditional crops. The need for water and flood control precipitated water development projects along the Nile, which often led to clashes between the British foreign office – Sudan was a British-Egyptian condominium at the time – and local Egyptians and Sudans. After World War I it became apparent that a formal allocations treaty would need to be signed to regulate water usage of the Nile. In 1920, the Nile Projects Commission was formed. Led by representatives from India, the United Kingdom, and the United States, the commission estimated water usage based on the water usage needs of each country. Based on an average flow rate of 84 bcm/y the commission estimated necessary Egyptian consumption to be 58 bcm/y, while Sudan was believed to be able to meet its irrigation needs using only the waters of the Blue Nile. The commission also proposed dividing any deviations from the annual average water flow equally between Egypt and Sudan. The findings of the commission, however, were never acted upon. Also in 1920, the British proposed the Century Storage Scheme, the most comprehensive plan for water development along the Nile. The plan called for a water storage facility to be built on the Uganda-Sudan border, a dam to be built at Sennar, Sudan, to irrigate the regions south of Sudan, and a dam along the White Nile to hold summer floodwaters for Egyptian dry-season consumption. The British scheme worried many Egyptians, as most of the major water structures were to be built outside of Egyptian territory. On May 7, 1929, Egypt and Sudan signed the Nile Waters Agreement. Based largely on findings from the 1920 commission, the treaty allocated 4 bcm/y to Sudan, and 48 bcm/y to Egypt. In between January 20 and July 15, however, the entire flow of the Nile was allocated for Egyptian consumption.

In the 1950s, Egypt unilaterally pursued construction of the Aswan High Dam until 1954, when the Sudanese was brought in on the negotiations. The first round of negotiations between Egypt and Sudan took place in December 1954, but was called off before a consensus could be reached. The two governments met again in April 1955, again failing to reach a compromise. Tensions mounted in 1958 after a failed Egyptian expedition into disputed territory along the Sudanese border. In response, Sudan raised the Sennar Dam in the summer of 1959, effectively repudiating the 1929 agreement signed with Egypt. The two countries signed the Agreement for the Full Utilization of the Nile Waters (Nile Waters Treaty) on November 8, 1959. The Nile Waters Treaty, based on an average annual water flow of 84 bcm/y provided the following:

- 55.5 bcm/y to Egypt, 18.5 bcm/y to Sudan.
- Any derivations from the average annual water flow were to be divided equally between Egypt and Sudan.
- Until 1977, Sudan would "loan" Egypt an additional 1.5 bcm/y.
- Any future developments that led to an increase in Nile water flow would be paid for equally between the two nations. Any resulting water was also to be split evenly between them.
- Egypt would repay Sudan 15 million British Pounds in compensation for past flooding that resulted from Egyptian water development projects.

Additionally, the 1959 treaty established a Permanent Joint Technical Committee to resolve any future conflicts. Both Sudan and Egypt agreed that the water needs of the other eight riparians would not exceed 1 to 2 bcm/y and further agreed to meet any threat to Nile resources with a unified Egyptian-Sudanese response. The building of the Aswan High Dam in the 1960s was contentious as it flooded areas of southern Sudan near Wadi Halfa and displaced Sudanese residents living along the Egyptian-Sudanese border.

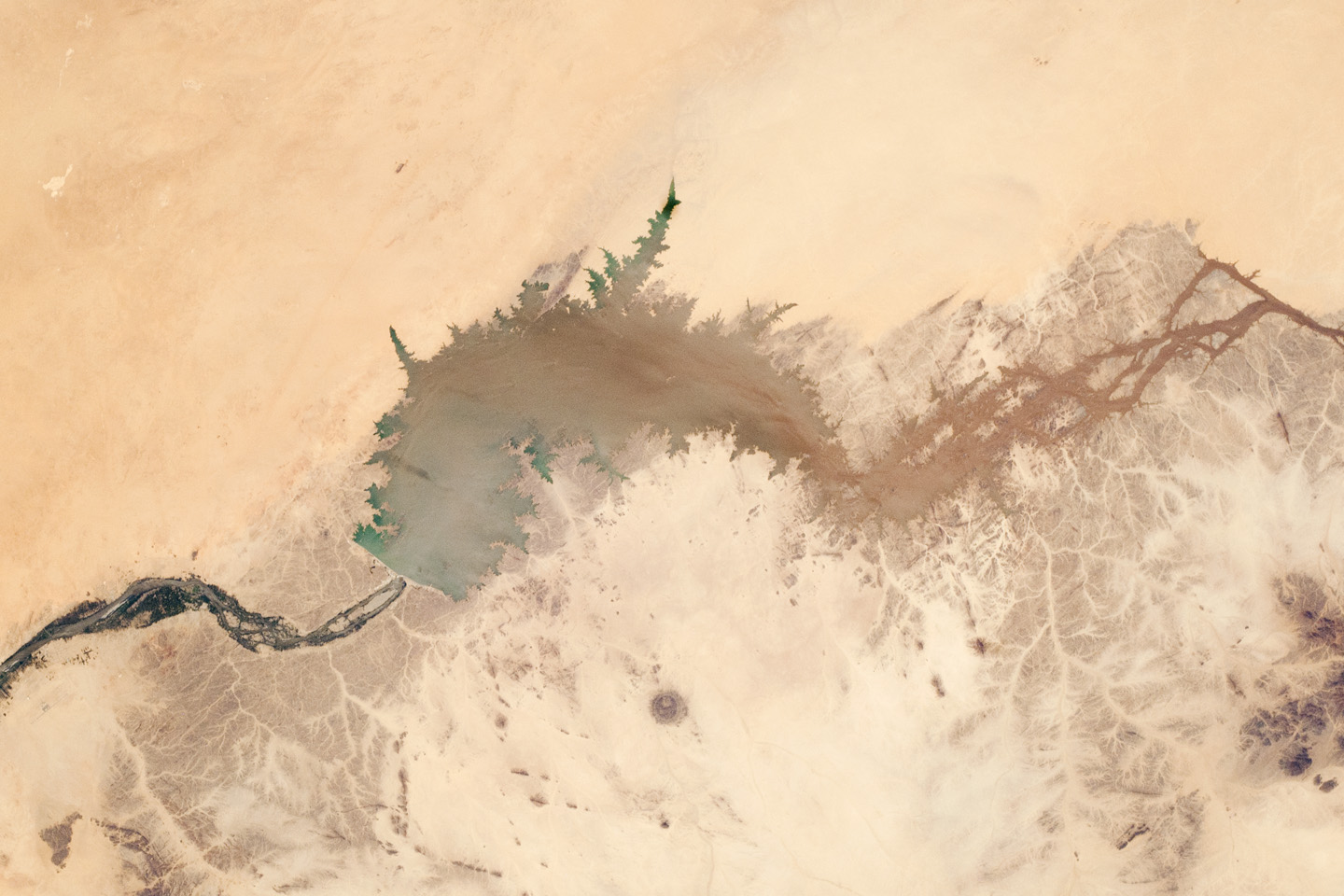
The Merowe Dam, as seen from space.

In the mid 1990s Egypt began a massive project just south of the Aswan. The New Delta Project in southern Egypt and the Salaam Canal in the Sinai Peninsula were both initiatives undertaken by former Egyptian president Hosni Mubarak to increase water supply for the expanding Egyptian population, which has dispersed further and further from the Nile. Increasing Egyptian water consumption is a source of conflict in the region as upstream riparians – Sudan and Ethiopia – have begun to assert their own rights to dam the river for hydroelectric development. Sudanese plans to build the Kajbar Dam near Khartoum at the confluence of the White and Blue Niles has caused much international tension. Sudan is also planning on building the Merowe Dam south of the Kajbar and enlarging the Roseires Dam, located 300 miles southeast of Khartoum on the Blue Nile. It is estimated that the building of these projects would likely lead to Sudan exceeding its water allotments from the 1959 treaty.

Ethiopia has also emerged as a major player in Nile River development. In 1957, they announced their intentions to pursue unilaterally the development of Nile River headwaters within Ethiopian territory. By the year 2000, more than 200 small dams had been constructed along Nile headwaters. Collectively, the dams will use nearly 500 million mcm/y of the Nile’s annual flow. Ethiopia is the only Nile River riparian to make a legal claim to Nile waters other than Egypt or Sudan since the Nile Waters Treaty was signed in 1959. Like in Egypt, population growth in Ethiopia has led to an increase in water consumption. Ethiopian population growth exceeds that of Egypt, and with populations of roughly equal size, Ethiopia’s water demands might exceed Egypt's. Irrigating only half of Ethiopia's arable lands would reduce water flow to downstream Sudan and Egypt by 15%. Later on, Ethiopia built the Grand Ethiopian Renaissance Dam which caused prolonged discussions regarding its impact on Egypt and Sudan.

== Tigris-Euphrates River Basin ==
=== Water resources ===
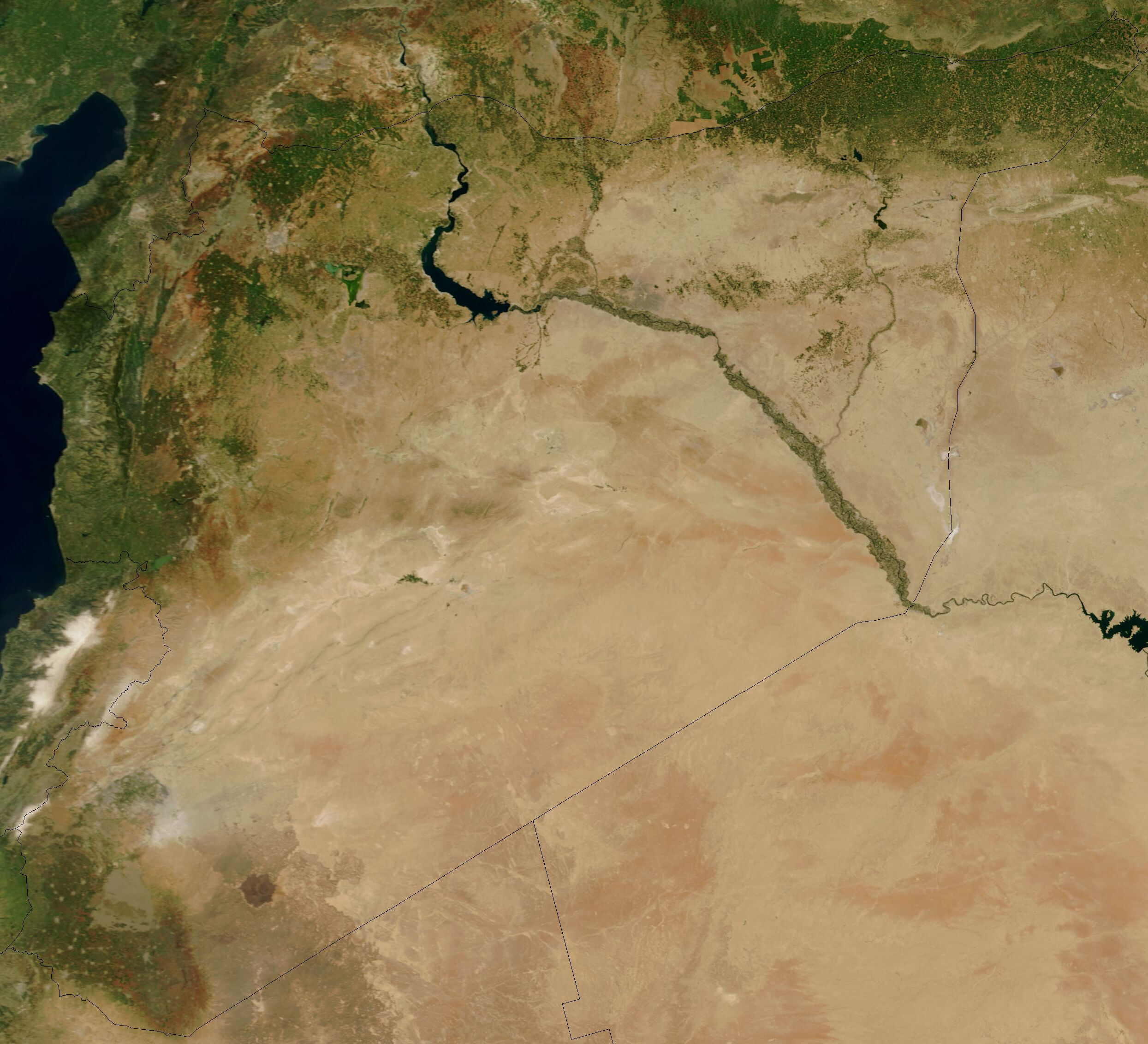
The Euphrates River in Syria.

The Tigris-Euphrates River Basin consists of its two primary rivers – The Tigris River and the Euphrates River – and their minor tributaries. Both the Tigris and the Euphrates originate in southeastern Turkey. The Tigris flows from Turkey, tracing the border between Turkey and Syria for 32 km before flowing south through Iraq. From its origin in Turkey, the Euphrates flows into Syria from the north, before continuing on through Iraq. The two rivers meet in Iraq to form the Shatt Al-Arab, which flows south into the Persian Gulf.

=== Regional conflict ===
Although hydropolitical tensions in the region have existed for centuries, population pressures in the 1960s led each country to pursue unilateral development of water resources. The Keban Dam was built in southern Anatolia from 1965 to 1973 and Syria built its Tabqa Dam between 1965 and 1973. Despite bilateral and sometimes tripartite (including the Soviet Union) negotiations, no formal agreements were in place when the two dams became operational in 1973. As the dams began to fill, downstream water flow decreased significantly. In 1974, Syria granted an Iraqi request and allowed an additional 200 mcm/year to flow from the Tabqa Dam. The following year, however, Iraq asked for Arab League intervention, citing that the flow of water reaching Iraq had fallen from the normal 920 m³/s to an "intolerable" 197 m³/s. The Syrian government responded by claiming that water flow into Syria had been reduced by more than 50%.

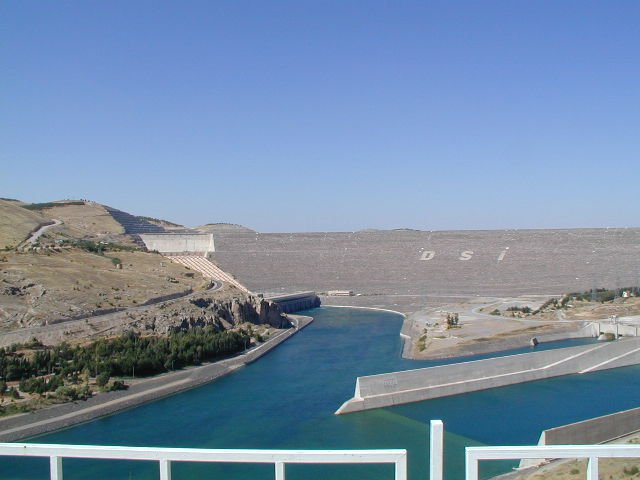
The Atatürk Dam along the Euphrates River

After trading mutually hostile statements, Syria withdrew from an Arab League committee tasked with resolving the dispute. Tension increased in May 1975 as Syria closed its airspace to Iraqi flights and both countries amassed troops on their borders. Saudi Arabian intervention, however, defused the situation with both sides arriving at an agreement that averted the impending violence. The terms of the agreement were never made public, but Iraqi sources have privately said that Syria was permitted to keep 40% of the water in the Euphrates flowing through its country, while 60% of the water was to be allowed to flow south through Iraq.

The Southeastern Anatolia Project (Turkish acronym: GAP) continues to be a source of tension in the region. GAP is a massive hydroelectric project, consisting of 21 dams and 19 hydroelectric facilities. The water will be used to generate 26 billion kilowatt-hours of electricity with an installed capacity of 7,500 megawatts and irrigate 1.65 million hectares of land. In 1987, Turkish Prime Minister Turgut Ozal reportedly signed an agreement guaranteeing a minimum flow of 500 mcm/y into Syria. Talks between Turkey, Syria, and Iraq were held again in January 1990 when Turkey shut off the flow of the Euphrates for 30 days by closing the gates of the Atatürk Dam. Iraq insisted that Turkey allow a minimum of 500 mcm/y to pass into Syria, but negotiations were suspended due to the outbreak of the first Gulf War. Negotiations after the war in September 1992 failed to reach an agreement.

In 2020, Iraqi authorities complained that the Ilısu Dam had decreased the Tigris river inflows and caused water shortages in Iraqi plains. In addition, Kurdish farmers in northern Iraq warned of a "catastrophe", after Iran deliberately cut off the flow of water from Sirwan and Lower Zab to Dukan and Darbandikhan dams. However, Syrian villagers also accused Turkey of cutting water access which decreased the Euphrates' water levels to 200 m³/s, which is 300 m³/s less than the already agreed amount between the two countries. Moreover, Turkish-backed Syrian rebels blocked the supply of water from Alok pumping station near Ras al-Ain which caused shortages in drinking water in Al-Hasakah Governorate. In May 2021, water flow of the Euphrates from Turkey to Syria had fallen again to nearly 200 m³/s, which caused electricity shortages. In the same month in Iraq, water inflows from Turkey decreased by 50% for both Tigris and Euphrates, meanwhile inflows of tributaries from Iran to Darbandikhan dam and Lower Zab decreased to non-existent and by 70% respectively.

== Blue Peace ==
The conflict regarding water in the Middle East could flare up in the coming days due to disputes over availability, use and management of water. The intense competition for water could even lead to regional war. That is why, cooperation is necessary to prevent conflicts and wars.

The Blue Peace method, which seeks to transforms trans-boundary water issues into instruments for cooperation, has proven to be effective in places like the Middle East and the Nile basin. This unique approach to turn tensions around water into opportunities for socio-economic development was developed by Strategic Foresight Group in partnership with the Governments of Switzerland and Sweden. A recent report "Water Cooperation for a Secure World" published by Strategic Foresight Group shows that active water cooperation between countries reduces the risk of war. This conclusion is reached after examining trans-boundary water relations in over 200 shared river basins in 148 countries. Countries in the Middle East face the risk of war as they have avoided regional cooperation for too long. The report provides examples of successful cooperation, which can be used by countries in the Middle East.

The challenges of water security have a great human costs and a much larger impact on the Middle East. Water insecurity is always accompanied by one or more issues such as poverty, war and conflict, low women’s development and environmental degradation. These devastating effects have been documented in two reports release in 2015: ‘The Hydro Insecure: Crisis of Survival in the Middle East’ and ' Water and Violence: Crisis of Survival in the Middle East'.

== Helmand River Basin ==
The Helmand River water agreement was signed in 1972 between Iran and Afghanistan and Iran.the agreement has 16 articles. However, Iran has always said that Afghanistan is not bound by the terms of the treaty

== See also ==
- Regional effects of climate change
- Water politics in the Jordan River basin
- Water politics in the Middle East
- Water politics in the Nile Basin
- Water conflict
