= War over Water (Jordan River) =

1964–1967 military confrontations between Israel and its neighbouring Arab states

- Part of the Arab-Israeli conflict
Date	November 1964 – May 1967
Location	Jordan River drainage basin and the Golan Heights
Result	Tensions contributing to the Six-Day War

Belligerents
Israel	Syria; Jordan; Lebanon

Commanders and leaders
(Israel) Zalman Shazar (Israel) Levi Eshkol (Israel) Yitzhak Rabin	(Ba'athist Syria) Amin al-Hafiz (Ba'athist Syria) Nureddin al-Atassi (Jordan) Hussein (Lebanon) Charles Helou

The War over Water, also known as the Battle over Water, was a series of confrontations between Israel and its Arab neighbors from November 1964 to May 1967 over control of water sources in the Jordan River drainage basin.

== History ==
=== Early tensions: 1949–1964 ===
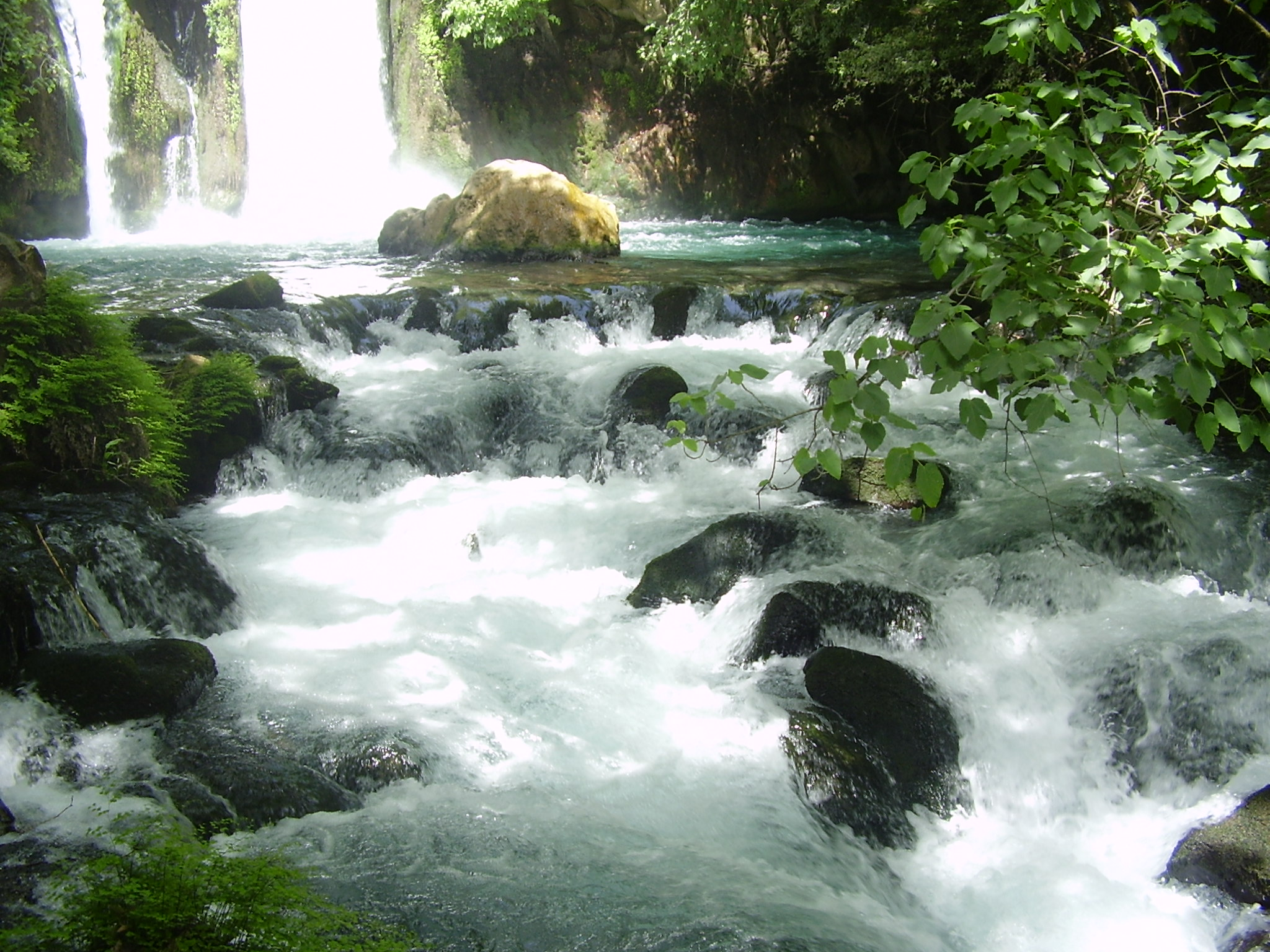
Banias waterfall, Golan Heights

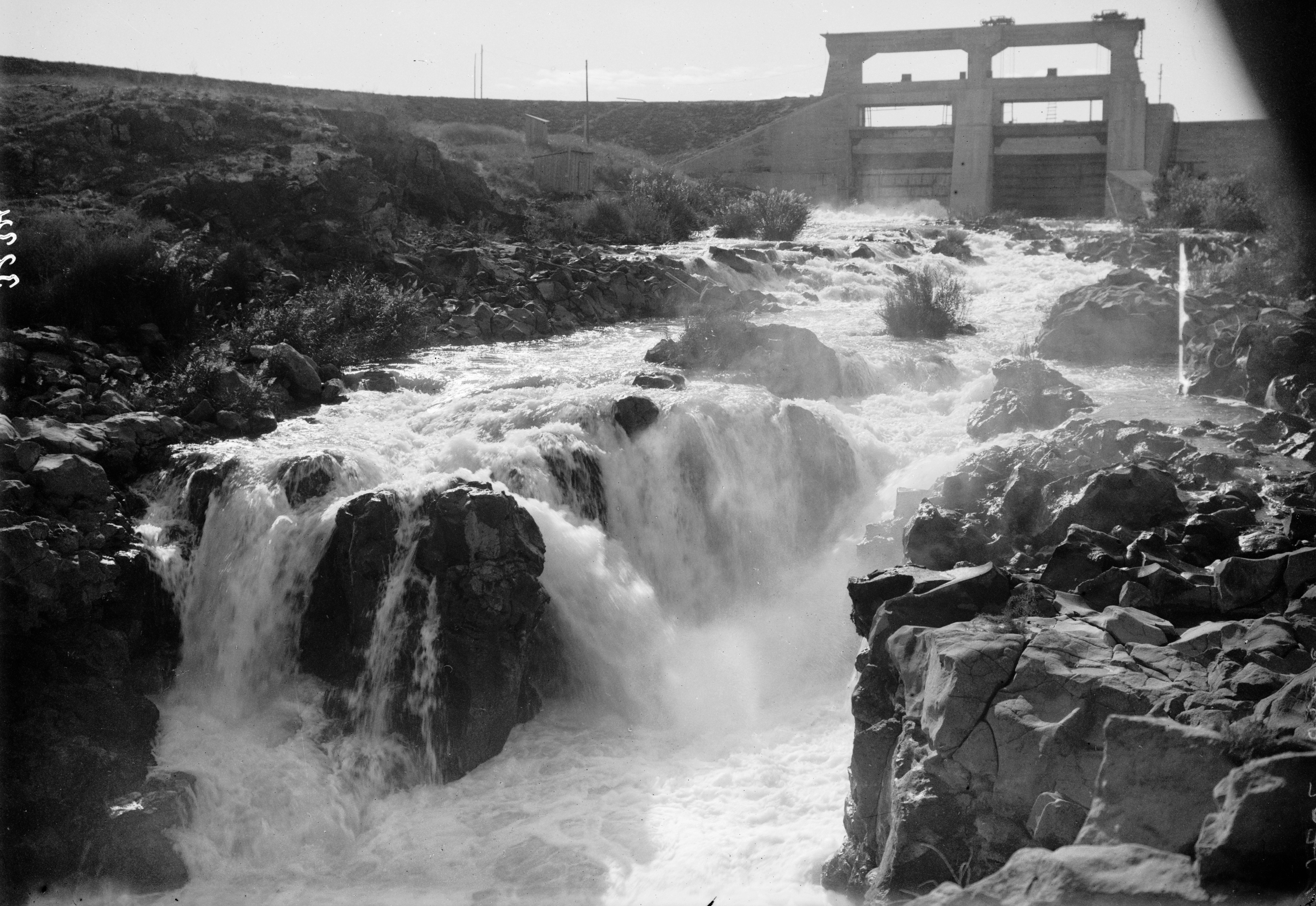
Flood waters exiting from the Yarmuk reservoir to the Yarmuk river, 1933

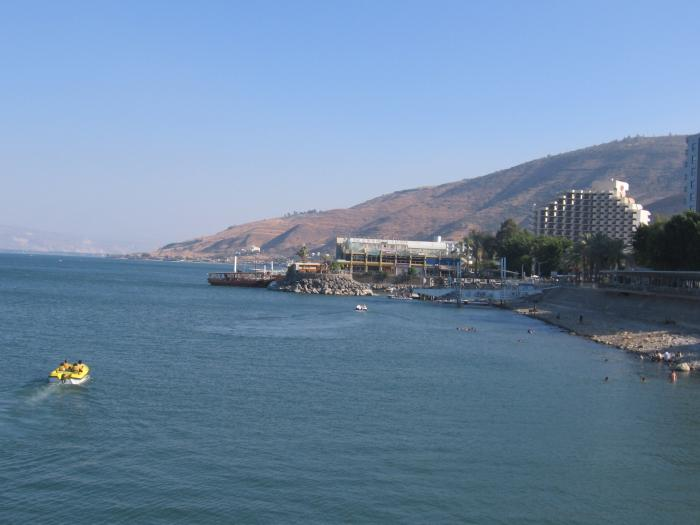
Lake Kinneret, Israel

Following the 1948 Arab–Israeli War, the 1949 Armistice Agreements created three demilitarized zones on the Israel-Syria border. The southernmost, and also the largest, stretched from the south-eastern part of the Sea of Galilee eastwards to the Yarmuk River where the borders of Israel, Jordan and Syria converge. The issue of water sharing from the Jordan–Yarmuk system turned out to be a major problem between Israel, Syria and Jordan.

Small-scale water-related skirmishes had occurred following the 1949 agreements. In July 1953, Israel began construction of an intake for its National Water Carrier at the Daughters of Jacob Bridge in the demilitarized zone north of the Sea of Galilee. Syria protested to the United Nations, and Syrian artillery units opened fire on the construction site. The UN Security Council voted to allow Israel to resume work, but this was vetoed by the Soviet Union. The Israelis then moved the intake to an economically inferior site at the Sea of Galilee.

In 1955 a United States-brokered deal, the Jordan Valley Unified Water Plan (Johnston Plan), was accepted by the technical committees of both Israel and the Arab League, but the Arab League Council decided on 11 October 1955 not to ratify the plan. According to most observers, including US envoy Eric Johnston, the Arab non-adoption of the plan was not total rejection. While they failed to approve it politically, they nevertheless seemed determined to adhere to the technical details of the agreement. Moreover, it continued to be taken seriously by Arab leaders. Though the Unified Plan failed to be ratified, both Jordan and Israel undertook to operate within their allocation limits.

=== Main phase: 1964–1967 ===
Israel's National Water Carrier project included works to pump water from the Sea of Galilee. Its initial diversion capacity, without supplementary booster pumps, was 320 million m^{3}, well within the limits of the Johnston Plan.

The Arab states were not prepared to accept a project which utilized resources that didn't belong to Israel. In January 1964 an Arab League summit meeting convened in Cairo and decided:

The establishment of Israel is the basic threat that the Arab nation in its entirety has agreed to forestall. And since the existence of Israel is a danger that threatens the Arab nation, the diversion of the Jordan waters by it multiplies the dangers to Arab existence. Accordingly, the Arab states have to prepare the plans necessary for dealing with the political, economic, and social aspects, so that if the necessary results are not achieved, collective Arab military preparations, when they are completed, will constitute the ultimate practical means for the final liquidation of Israel.

Pumping from the Sea of Galilee commenced in June 1964. In November 1964, the Syrian military fired on Israeli patrols around the National Water Carrier works, drawing Israeli counterattacks.

Border clashes ensued, with Syrian forces firing on Israeli farmers and army patrols, and Israeli tanks and artillery destroying Syrian tanks as well as earth-moving equipment used for the diversion plan. In July 1966, the Israeli Air Force bombed a concentration of earth-moving equipment and shot down a Syrian MiG-21.

The Arab states abandoned the diversion effort, but conflict continued on the Israel–Syria border, including an Israeli air strike into Syrian territory in April 1967. Control of water resources became a significant factor behind the outbreak of the Six-Day War in June 1967.

The war is referenced in the famous US antiwar 1965 song "Eve of Destruction" by Barry McGuire with the line "And even the Jordan River has bodies floatin'".

== Headwater Diversion Plan ==

The Arab states accepted that they were not able to halt the Carrier scheme by direct military action, and instead formed a plan to divert the Jordan River headwaters to the Yarmouk River. Work on the project began in 1965. The scheme was technically difficult and expensive, but if it had succeeded, it would have diverted 35% of the water that Israel intended to withdraw from the upper Jordan. Israel declared that it would regard the diversion as an infringement of its sovereign rights. After the Suez Crisis in 1956, Arab attitudes hardened considerably, and the Arab League, with the exception of Jordan, now actively opposed the Johnston plan, arguing that any plan to strengthen the Israeli economy only increased the potential threat from Israel. In 1964 when Israel's National Water Carrier was nearing completion, the second Arab League summit conference voted on a plan designed to circumvent and frustrate it. Their resolution stated:

The establishment of Israel is the basic threat that the Arab nation in its entirety has agreed to forestall. And since the existence of Israel is a danger that threatens the Arab nation, the diversion of the Jordan waters by it multiplies the dangers to Arab existence. Accordingly, the Arab states have to prepare the plans necessary for dealing with the political, economic and social aspects, so that if necessary results are not achieved, collective Arab military preparations, when they are not completed, will constitute the ultimate practical means for the final liquidation of Israel.

The Arab and North African states chose to divert the Jordan headwaters rather than to use direct military intervention. The heads of State of the Arab League considered two options:

1. The diversion of the Hasbani to the Litani combined with the diversion of the Banias to the Yarmouk,
2. The diversion of both the Hasbani and the Banias to the Yarmouk.

The second option was selected. The scheme was only marginally feasible, was technically difficult and expensive. Arab political considerations were cited to justify the diversion scheme. Syria began its part of the overall Arab diversion plan with the construction of the Banias to Yarmouk canal in 1965, with financing from Egypt and Saudi Arabia. Once completed, the diversion of the flow would have transported the water into a dam at Mukhaiba for use by Jordan and Syria and prevent the water from reaching the Sea of Galilee. Lebanon also started a canal to divert the waters of the Hasbani, whose source is in Lebanon, into the Banias. The Hasbani and Banias diversion works would have reduced the capacity of the Israeli carrier from the Sea of Galilee by about 35% and Israel's overall water supply by about 11%. Additionally, it would have increased the salinity of the Sea of Galilee by 60 ppm.

Israel exploited the incidents in the demilitarized zone as pretexts for bombing the diversion project, culminating in airstrikes deep in Syrian territory in April 1967.

== See also ==
- Water politics in the Middle East
