= Water politics in the Middle East =

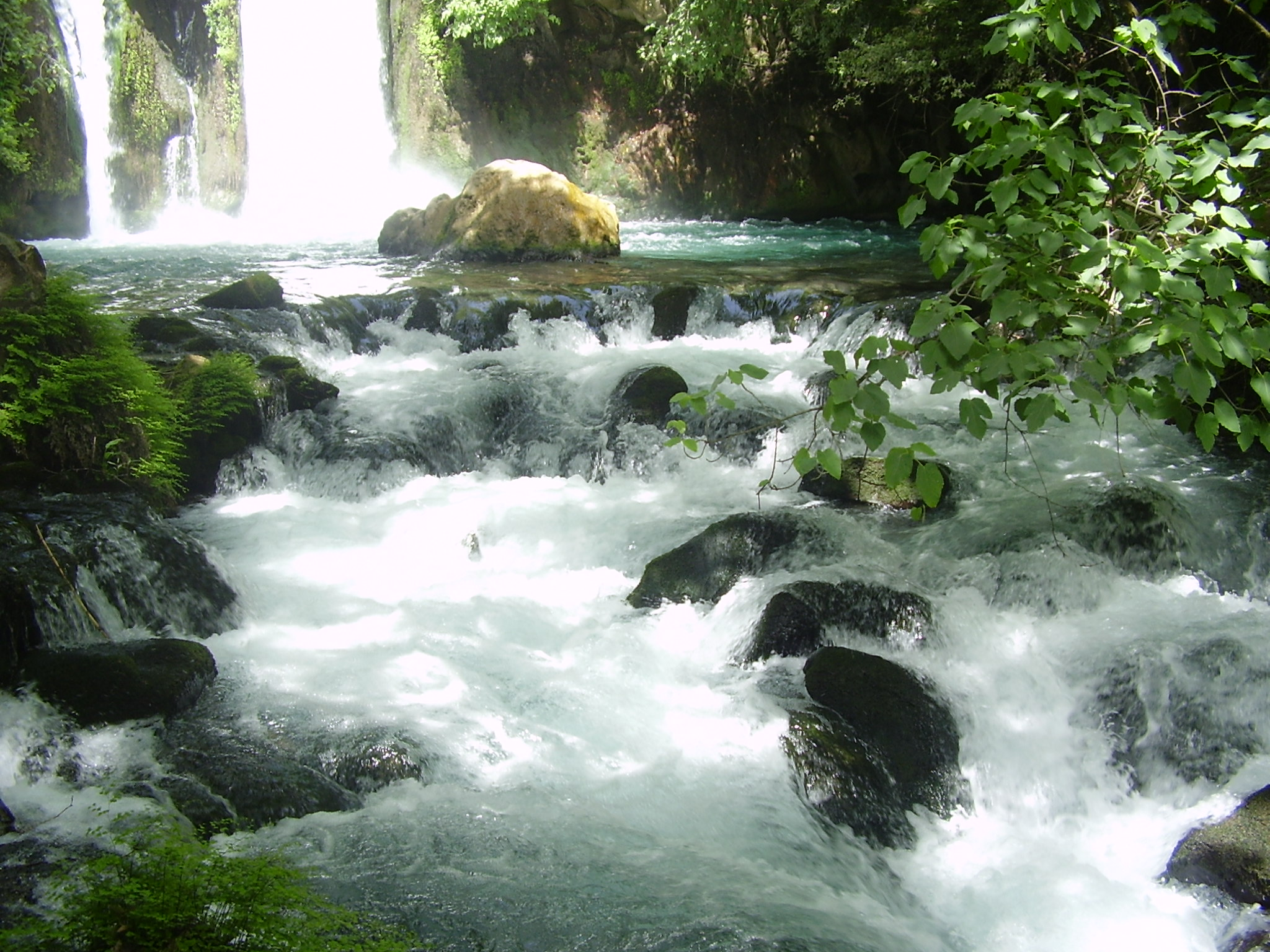
Banias waterfall, Golan Heights

Water politics in the Middle East deals with control of the water resources of the Middle East, an arid region where issues of the use, supply, control, and allocation of water are of central economic importance. Politically contested watersheds include the Tigris–Euphrates river system which drains to the south-east through Iraq into the Persian Gulf, the Nile basin which drains northward through Egypt into the eastern Mediterranean Sea, and the Jordan River basin which flows into the Dead Sea (400 m below sea level), a land-locked and highly saline sea bordered by Jordan to the east and Israel to the west.

Especially the Nile and the Tigris–Euphrates formed the Fertile Crescent, a cradle of civilization and birthplace of agriculture (and agrarianism) dating back 10,000 years. Farmers in the Mesopotamian plain practiced irrigation from at least the third millennium BCE.

In the modern era, water politics in the region intensified with the Israeli Declaration of Independence of 14 May 1948, a central event of the 1948 Arab–Israeli War. Soon thereafter, Israel initiated a unilateral water-diversion project within the Jordan River basin in development of Israel's National Water Carrier. Concurrently with these actions, the Jordan Valley Unified Water Plan was negotiated and developed by US ambassador Eric Johnston between 1953 and 1955 and approved by technical water committees of all the regional riparian countries—Israel, Jordan, Lebanon and Syria—though rejected by the Arab League. Armed conflict resulted in the 1960s, culminating in the Six-Day War of June 1967. A broad political treaty between Israel and Jordan signed in 1994 is the only such agreement in the region to lead to recognition of water rights on both sides, though diplomatic tensions around this treaty continue to flare up due to subsequent drought conditions.

== Overview ==
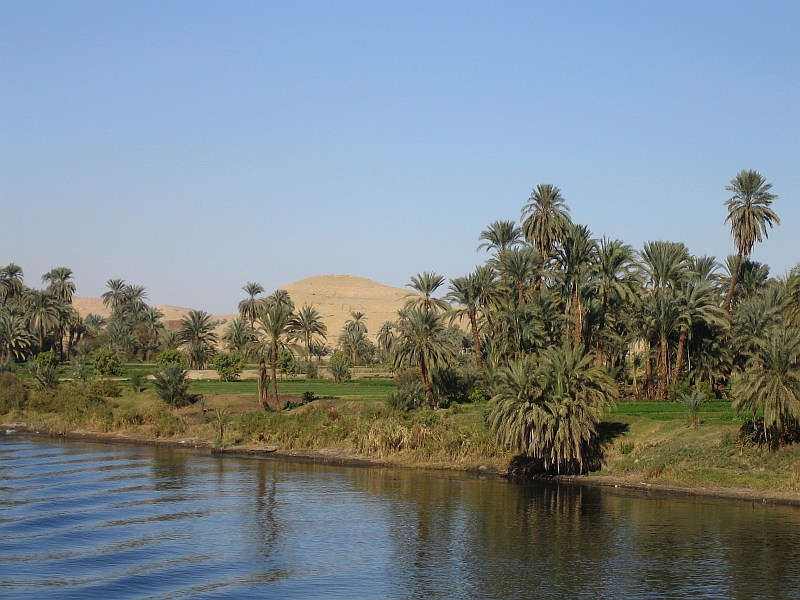
Nile River, Egypt

Water politics plays a role in various areas of politics in the Middle East, and it is particularly important in one of the defining features of the region's political landscape. Water issues reflect a central aspect of the nature of the Israeli–Palestinian conflict; namely, the original influx of an additional large population mass to a relatively fragile geographical area of land, and the massive expansion of previously existing populations. Concerns over water have significantly helped to shape the Middle East's political development.

== International relations and water ==
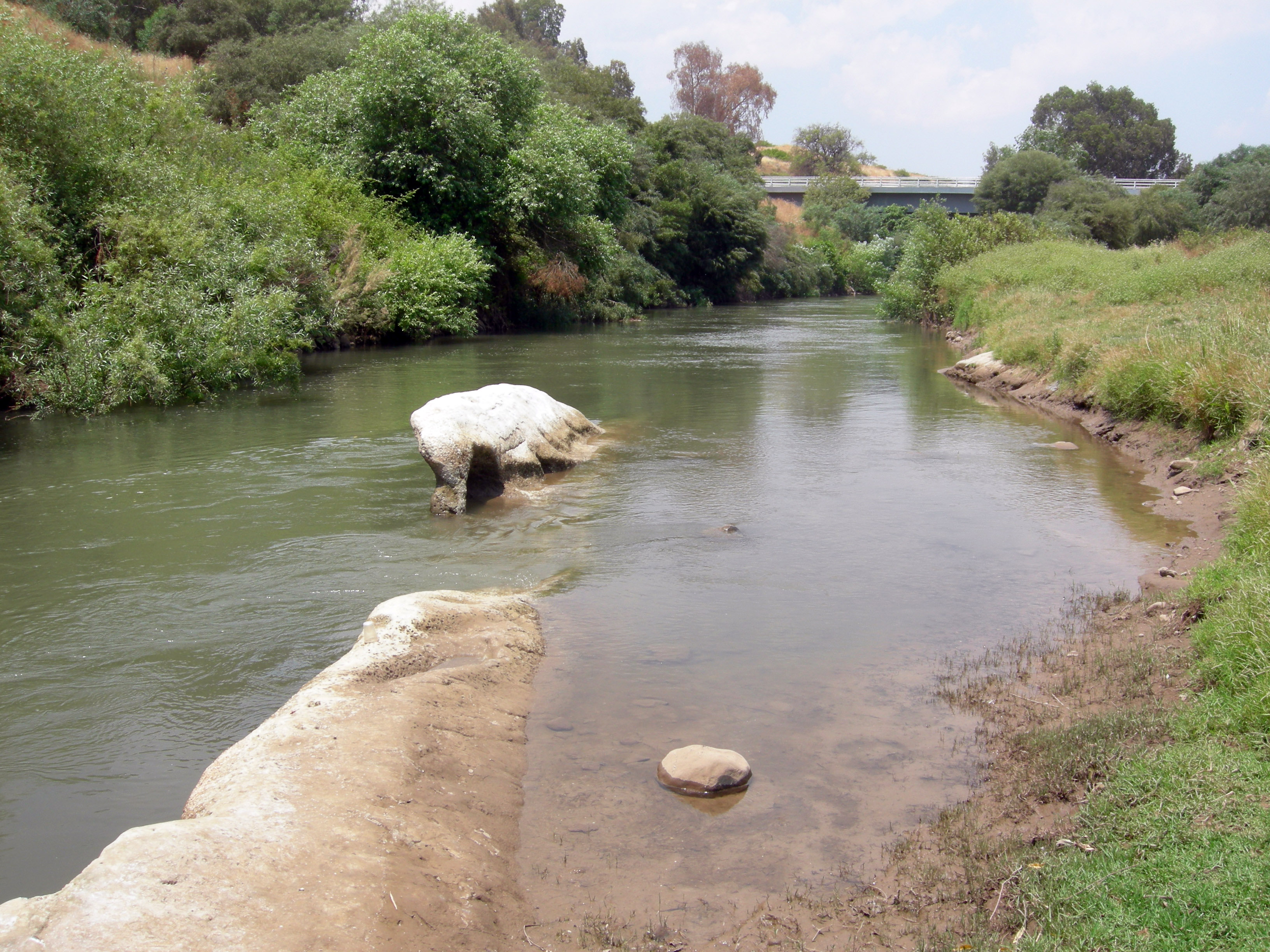
Jordan River near B'not Yaakov bridge, Israel

Issues relating to water supplies, then, affect international and inter-regional affairs, with disputes over countries' rights and access to water resources most often the cause of tensions in this arena. The contended nature of some water provisions has tended to mean that certain waters become more prone to political conflicts. (Those primarily prone to this in the Middle East and northern Africa are the Nile, Jordan and Tigris-Euphrates rivers.) To secure reliable water access for their populations, states must either have a large water supply in terms of economic availability, or established rights to such supplies. Studies of water in the Middle East have also suggested that, in a sensitive hydrological location, a country's existing surface- and ground-water access should be protected as a first priority if it is to begin to address any water difficulties or shortages. Such measures as these can be seen as being the primary responsibilities of national governments or ruling authorities; and water is therefore closely tied up with statehood and geographical territory in international relations, and with the recognition and rights of nation states as the central actors in this field.

The political process and interactions underlying the international relations of water have been characterised as having three stages. These are that a state must go through a process of; firstly claiming its right to water resources, secondly receiving recognition of this right, and finally seeking to attain its entitlement to water in accordance with the recognition of its claim. However, these processes have not always succeeded.

In this regard, water politics in the Middle East has been impacted by changes in the international political order and their implications for the area. The involvement of the USSR in Middle Eastern political affairs was seen to have had a constraining effect upon this process, in terms of claims and recognition in the Cold War era.

The post–Cold War period, therefore, has since been perceived to offer the opportunity for transforming water politics in the Middle East, in light of the shift it brought about in global political dynamics in the region. This potential, however, was not fulfilled by the end of the decade, with states in the Middle East 'still mainly involved in... asserting water rights over shared waters'. The consequence of this has been that 'non-agreed water sharing is an unavoidable reality in present Middle Eastern international relations', with attendant political problems invariably surfacing.

== Middle Eastern river systems ==
The claims over rights to water in the Middle East are centred around the area's three major river systems – the Nile, the River Jordan, and the Tigris-Euphrates river basin. International water agreements in Middle East have been rare, but the situation regarding regional water relations in the three main basins will be explored below.

=== The Nile ===
As with the other major Middle Eastern river systems, political agreements over access to the water of the Nile have been few and far between. The first such accord was the 1929 Nile Agreement. However, this was an agreement that largely represented the nature of world geopolitical realities at that time, rather than being a mutual expression of accord between the participating parties of the region.

This, it is argued, is because it was essentially a product of British national interest. The priority of the United Kingdom, as part of its strategy as the dominant contemporary political and economic power in the Middle East, was maintaining secure supplies of water to Egypt, and this was what the agreement primarily provided for.

The next agreement on water use in the Nile did not come for exactly three more decades. The new 1959 Nile Agreement was signed by Egypt and Sudan, and was at this point free from political influence by the UK. However, the limitation of this agreement was that it was not more than a bilateral treaty between the two participant countries and, as such, it provided solely for an agreement on the sharing of water between the two nations. The 1959 Nile Agreement has not been granted recognition by the other states through which the Nile also runs.

=== Tigris-Euphrates river basin ===
Countries that rely on the Tigris-Euphrates water system remain at the first stage of claiming their rights to water. However, the key player in terms of water politics in this area is Turkey, who Allan reports as having "gone a substantial way to[wards]… what it regards as its water rights by its construction programs on the Euphrates without having them recognized by downstream Syria and Iraq". This refers to the dams built by Turkey from the 1970s, partially funded by World Bank loans.

=== River Jordan ===
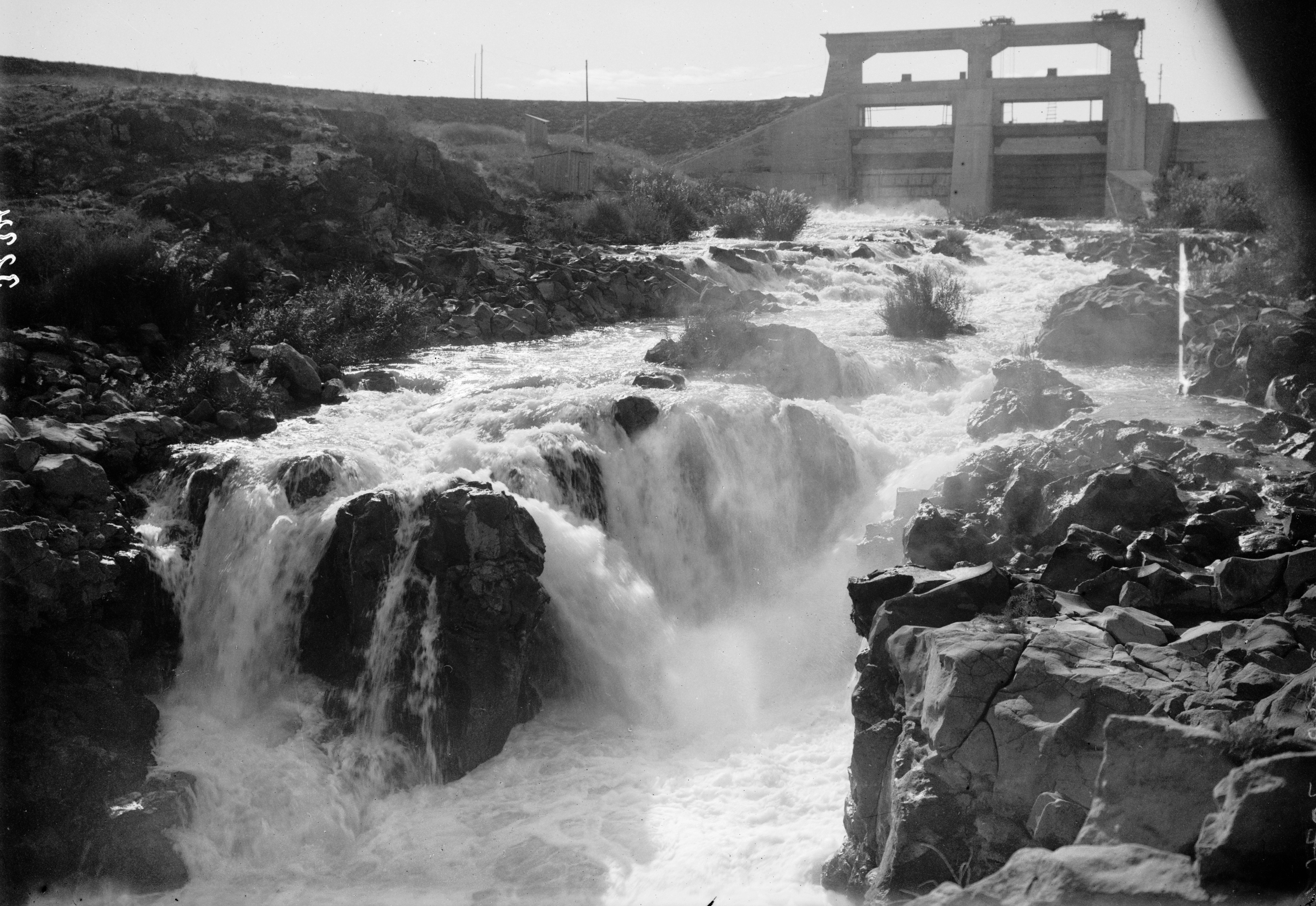
Flood waters exiting from the Yarmuk reservoir to the Yarmuk river, 1933

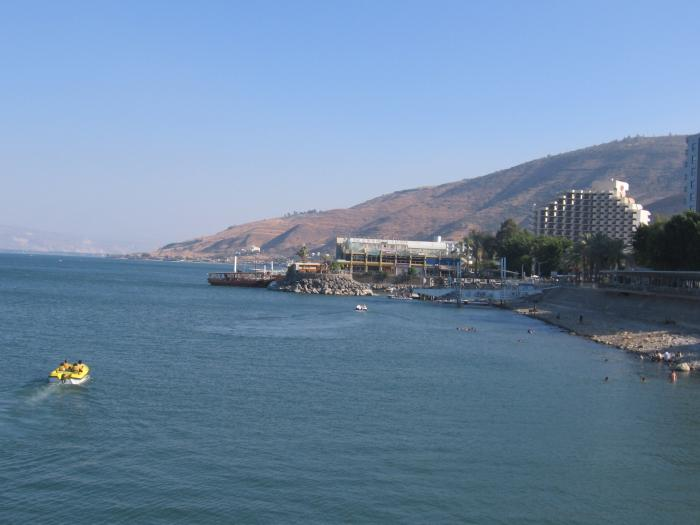
Sea of Galilee, Israel

The Syria-Lebanon-Palestine boundary was a product of the post–World War I Anglo-French partition of Ottoman Syria. British forces had advanced to a position at Tel Hazor against Turkish troops in 1918 and wished to incorporate all the sources of the river Jordan within the British controlled Palestine. Due to the French inability to establish administrative control, the frontier between Syria and Palestine was fluid until 1934, when the French managed to assert authority over the Arab nationalist movement and King Faisal had been deposed. In the unratified Treaty of Sèvres from the San Remo conference, the 1920 boundary extended the British controlled area to north of the Sykes Picot line (straight line between the midpoint of the Sea of Galilee and Nahariya). The international boundary between Palestine and Syria was finally agreed by Great Britain and France in 1923 with the Treaty of Lausanne after Britain had been given a League of Nations mandate for Palestine in 1922. Banyas (on the Quneitre/Tyre road) was within the French Mandate of Syria. The border was set 750 metres south of the spring.

In 1941 Australian forces occupied Banyas in the advance to the Litani during the Syria-Lebanon Campaign. When Free French and Indian forces invaded Syria in the Battle of Kissoué In 1946, France and Britain signed a bilateral agreement to hand over control of the Banias to the British Mandate authorities although the Syrian government declared France's signature invalid. British Mandate projects to drain the marshland for cultivation angered the Arab villagers.

After the establishment of the State of Israel, Syria offered to adjust the armistice lines, and cede to Israel's 70% of the DMZ, in exchange for a return to the pre-1946 border in the Jordan basin area, with Banias water resources returning uncontested to Syrian sovereignty. On 26 April, the Israeli cabinet met to consider the Syrian suggestions; with head of Israel's Water Planning Authority, Simha Blass, in attendance. Blass noted that while the land to be ceded to Syria was not suitable for cultivation, the Syrian map did not suit Israel's water development plan. Blass explained that the movement of the International boundary in the area of Banias would affect Israel's water rights.

On 13 April, the Syrian delegates seemed very anxious to move forward and offered Israel around 70% of the DMZ's. Significant results were achieved and a number of suggestions and summaries put in writing, but they required decisions by the two governments. The Israeli cabinet convened on 26 April to consider the Syrian proposals. Simha Blass, head of Israel's Water Planning Authority, was invited to the meeting. Dayan showed Blass the Syrian suggestions on the map. Blass told Dayan that although most of the lands that Israel was expected to relinquish were not suitable for cultivation, the map did not suit Israel's irrigation and water development plans. On 4 and 27 May, Israel presented its new conditions. These were rejected by Syria, and the negotiations ended without agreement.

In 1951 Israel started the Hula Valley Swamps drainage works. In 1953, Israel unilaterally started a water diversion project within the Jordan River basin by the Israeli National Water Carrier. In September 1953 Israel advanced plans to divert water to help irrigate the coastal Sharon Plain and eventually the Negev desert by launching a diversion project on a nine-mile (14 km) channel midway between the Huleh Marshes and Lake Galilee (Lake Tiberias) in the central DMZ to be rapidly constructed. Syria claimed that it would dry up 12,000 acres (49 km^{2}) of Syrian land. The UNTSO Chief of Staff Major General Vagn Bennike of Denmark claimed the project would divert water to two Palestinian water mills and dry up Palestinian farmland. UN Security Council Resolution 100 deemed it desirable for Israel to suspend work started on 2 September "pending urgent examination of the question by the Council". The Security Council ultimately rejected Syrian claims that the work was a violation of the Armistice Agreements. Hula Valley Swamps drainage works were resumed and the work was completed in 1957.

National Water Carrier of Israel

On 1964 Israel completed its National Water Carrier, which siphoned water (within the limits of the Johnston Plan) from the Sea of Galilee. The water was used for irrigation of the southern Negev desert.

In January 1964 an Arab League summit meeting convened in Cairo. The main item on the agenda was Israel's diversion of water from the north to irrigate the south and the expected reduction in the water supplies available to Syria and Jordan. The preamble to its decision stated that "the establishment of Israel is the basic threat that the Arab nation in its entirety has agreed to forestall. And since the existence of Israel is a danger that threatens the Arab nation, the diversion of the Jordan waters by it multiplies the dangers to Arab existence. Accordingly, the Arab states have to prepare the plans necessary for dealing with the political, economic and social aspects, so that if necessary results are not achieved, collective Arab military preparations, when they are not completed, will constitute the ultimate practical means for the final liquidation of Israel."

The project was to divert 20 to 30 million cubic metres of water from the river Jordan tributaries to Syria and Jordan for the development of Syria and Jordan. This led to military intervention from Israel, first with tank fire and then, as the Syrians shifted the works further eastward, with airstrikes.

On 10 June 1967, the last day of the Six Day War, Golani Brigade forces invaded the village of Banyas where a Syrian fort stood. Eshkol's priority on the Syrian front was control of the water sources.

Jordan claims it has riparian rights to water from the Jordan basin and upper Jordan tributaries. Due to the water diversion projects, the flow to the river Jordan was reduced from 1,300/1,500 million cubic metres to 250/300 million cubic metres. Water quality was further reduced as the flow of the river Jordan consists run-off from agricultural irrigation and saline springs.

The agreement between Jordan and Israel is the only one in the Middle East region to lead to recognition of water rights on both sides. The water agreement forms a part of the broader political treaty that Israel and Jordan signed in 1994. In 1999, when the treaty's limitations were revealed by events concerning water shortages in the Jordan basin. A reduced supply of water to Israel due to drought meant that Israel, which is responsible for providing water to Jordan, decreased its water provisions to the country, provoking a diplomatic disagreement between the two and bringing the water component of the treaty back into question.

Israel's complaints about the reduction in water from the tributaries to the river Jordan caused by the Jordan/Syrian dam have gone unheeded.

== Blue Peace ==
Constant conflict in the Middle East has seen some major environmental consequences of water related damage. A report by Strategic Foresight Group, a think tank in Asia, details in the damage and destruction done to water systems and resources. The Middle East is an extremely water scarce region and any damage to this vital resource has an adverse impact on health, bio-diversity, and eco-systems in the region. Water scarcity in the future could be both cause and cost of conflict. A new approach to water in the Middle East was introduced by Strategic Foresight Group, in a report co-sponsored by the Swiss and Swedish governments titled The Blue Peace: Rethinking Middle East Water Blue Peace is defined as the comprehensive, integrated and collaborative management of all water resources in a circle of countries in a way that is sustainable for the long-term, in an interdependent relationship with social and political dynamics. Instead of concentrating on how to share or divide the stock of water resources, the Blue Peace approach is concerned about preserving, expanding and improving the water budget for the benefit of human life, as well as environment. The Blue Peace is derived from and reinforced by positive relations between water and society and between one society and another. A recent report "Water Cooperation for a Secure World" published by Strategic Foresight Group concludes that active water cooperation between countries reduces the risk of war. This conclusion is reached after examining trans-boundary water relations in over 200 shared river basins in 148 countries. Countries in the Middle East face the risk of war as they have avoided regional cooperation for too long. The report provides examples of successful cooperation, which can be used by countries in the Middle East.

== Aquifers ==
In the 1970s, the government of Saudi Arabia encouraged water well drilling, expanding irrigation in Saudi Arabia significantly. This led to an agricultural boom, with a particular emphasis on wheat cultivation for export. By the 1990s, rapid extraction of water, reaching trillions of gallons annually, had severely depleted the country's aquifers. By 2015, Saudi agricultural production had fallen significantly, and the country was relying heavily on agricultural imports.

== See also ==
- Draining of the Mesopotamian Marshes
- The Environmental Provisions of Oslo II Accords
- Water conflict in the Middle East and North Africa

== Sources ==
- Allan, J. A.; Court, J. H. O. (1996). "The Jordan-Israel Peace Agreement – September 1994". Water, Peace and the Middle East: Negotiating Resources in the Jordan Basin. London, St. Martin's Press [distributor]: I.B. Tauris Academic Studies. ISBN 1-86064-055-9.
- Allan, J. A. (Summer–Fall 2002a). "Hydro-Peace in the Middle East: Why no Water Wars?: A Case Study of the Jordan River Basin". SAIS Review. 22 (2). The Johns Hopkins University Press: 255–272. doi:10.1353/sais.2002.0027.
- Allan, Tony (2002). The Middle East Water Question: Hydropolitics and the Global Economy. I. B. Tauris. ISBN 1-86064-813-4.
- Amery, Hussein A.; Wolf, Aaron T. (2000). Water in the Middle East: A Geography of Peace University of Texas Press. University of Texas Press. ISBN 0-292-70495-X.
- de Châtel, Francesca (May 2011). "Instrument for Peace in the Middle East". Revolve Magazine.
- Collins, R. O. (1990). The Waters of the Nile: Hydropolitics and the Jonglei Canal, 1900-1988. Oxford: Clarendon Press. ISBN 1-55876-099-7.
- Collins, R. O. (1995). "History, Hydropolitics and the Nile: Nile Control – Myth or Reality?". In Paul Philip Howell; John Anthony Allan (eds.). The Nile: Sharing a Scarce Resource. Cambridge: Cambridge University Press. ISBN 0-521-45040-3.)
- Crawford, Harriet, ed. (2013). The Sumerian World. Routledge Worlds. Abingdon, Oxfordshire: Routledge. ISBN 9781136219115.
- Fromkin, David (1989). A Peace to End All Peace: The Fall of the Ottoman Empire and the Creation of the Modern Middle East. New York: Owl. ISBN 0-8050-6884-8.
- Gammer, M.; Kostiner, Joseph; Shemesh, Moshe (2003). Political Thought and Political History: Studies in Memory of Elie Kedourie By Elie Kedourie. Routledge. ISBN 0-7146-5296-2.
- Halverson, Nathan (22 April 2015). "What California can learn from Saudi Arabia's water mystery". The Center for Investigative Reporting.
- MacMillan, Margaret (2001). Peacemakers: The Paris Conference of 1919 and Its Attempt to End War. J. Murray. ISBN 0-7195-5939-1.
- Rinat, Tzafrir (18 October 2006). "Environmentalists: New dam may cause Jordan River to dry up". Ha'aretz. Archived from the original on 5 November 2006.
- Segev, Tom (2007). 1967 Israel and the war that transformed the Middle East. Little, Brown. ISBN 978-0-316-72478-4.
- Shapira, Anita (1999). Land and Power; The Zionist Resort to Force, 18812000. Stanford University press. ISBN 0-8047-3776-2.
- Shapland, Greg (1997). Rivers of Discord: International Water Disputes in the Middle East. Palgrave MacMillan. ISBN 9780312165222.
- Shlaim, Avi (2000). The iron wall: Israel and the Arab world. W.W. Norton. ISBN 0-393-04816-0.
- "UN Doc S/2157 Resolution of 18 May 1951". United Nations.
- "UN Doc S 3182 UN Security Council Resolution 100 of 27th October 1953". United Nations.
- "UN Doc S/4271 Letter dated 25 February 1960 from the representative of Israel to the President of the Security Council". United Nations. 25 February 1960. Archived from the original on 12 June 2012.
- Water Cooperation for a Secure World (PDF). Strategic foresight Group. 2013. ISBN 978-81-88262-18-2.
- Wilson, John Francis (2004). Caesarea Philippi: Banias, the Lost City of Pan. I. B. Tauris. ISBN 1-85043-440-9.
