= Walter C. Lowdermilk =

American conservationist (1888–1974)

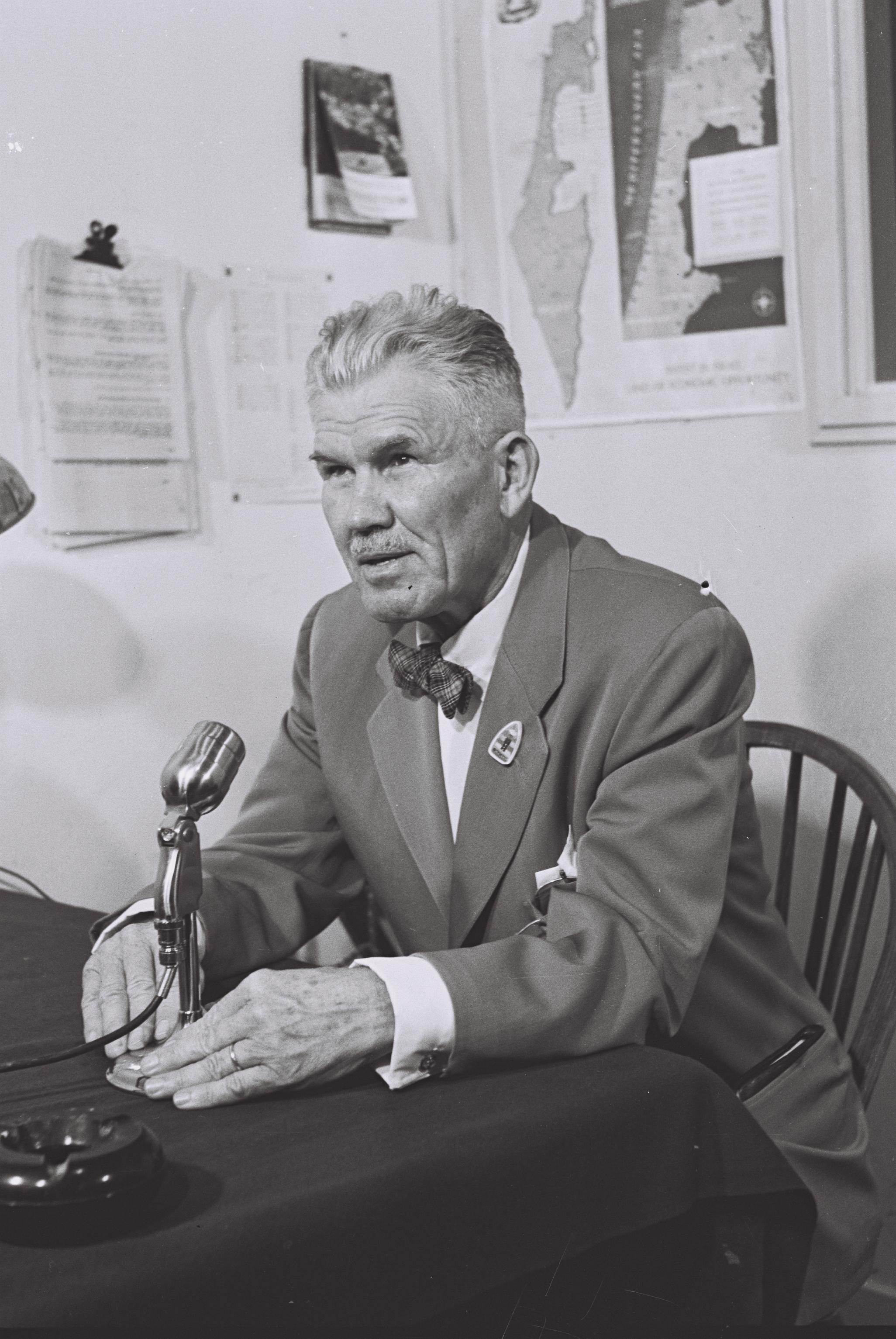
Lowdermilk in October 1953

Walter Clay Lowdermilk (July 1, 1888 – May 6, 1974) was an American soil conservationist who worked in countries throughout the world to help protect and reclaim lands in order to better feed their population. Lowdermilk worked with the Belgian Relief Effort (B.R.E., active 1914–1916 in Belgium and France) after World War I, in China in the 1920s to help avert famine, with the Soil Conservation Service, in fascist Italy in the 1930s, in the United States, and in Mandatory Palestine planning land and water use.

In the latter he was impressed by the advanced techniques that the Zionist settlers, and later the State of Israel, took to develop water efficient agriculture and land use. A 1944 outline of local water development became known as the "Lowdermilk plan" and was of importance for the later National Water Carrier of Israel.

== Education and career ==
Walter Clay Lowdermilk was named a Rhodes Scholar in 1911, attending Oxford after his undergraduate education at the University of Arizona. He married Inez Marks in August 1922. They had two children: Winifred Esther Lowdermilk (married Wilmot N. Hess) and William Francis Lowdermilk (deceased). Lowdermilk received his PhD from the University of California in 1929. He served in World War I as an engineer and in the Belgian Relief Commission (1917–1918). He was active as a Flood control engineer and scientist in China and was Assistant Chief of the U.S. Soil Conservation Service, US Department of Agriculture. He served as a President of the American Geophysical Union (1941–1944).

== Positions and style ==
Lowdermilk's assumptions about soil conservation had a strong focus on cultural background. He was a conservationist influenced by George Perkins Marsh.

His public speeches and popular books contained various allegation to religious and historical evidence and legends. Compare:

"Thou shalt inherit the holy earth as a faithful steward conserving its resources and productivity from generation to generation. Thou shalt safeguard thy fields from soil erosion, thy living waters from drying up, thy forests from desolation, and protect thy hills from overgrazing by the herds, that thy descendants may have abundance forever. If any shall fail in this stewardship of the land, thy fruitful fields shall become sterile stony ground or wasting gullies, and thy descendants shall decrease and live in poverty or perish from off the face of the earth.

The Eleventh Commandment written and broadcast over the radio by Dr. Lowdermilk in Jerusalem during June 1939 was dedicated to the Palestinian Jewish villages whose good stewardship of the earth inspired this idea." Palestine, Land of Promise (1944) is one of his books. One of his pamphlets, Conquest of the Land Through Seven Thousand Years, was copied in the millions.

He was quite positive about the Italian (fascist) land reclamation projects in the Pontine Marshes in Italy, which was, in the early stages of the New Deal and before Italy–United States relations degraded, rather common for especially democratic leaning Americans.

In 1940 he provided a rather critical review of the White Paper of 1939. He cited the dire fate of mostly Christian Assyrians in Iraq (compare Iraq Levies) after the British left the former mandate. Lowdermilk assumed, that the Jews in the then Palestine Mandate region 'would be massacred' similarly by Muslims, if left as a minority. Lowdermilk and his wife Inez, themselves gentiles, supported the Zionist cause and Jewish settlements in Palestine. He was quite optimistic about the absorptive capacity of the region for enhanced settlements.

A water development project outlined by him became later known as the "Lowdermilk plan" The Plan was recommended by the United States in 1944 and is still of importance for the later National Water Carrier of Israel. Parts of it, as the use of the Litani River to irrigate the Negev desert have been controversial. As early as 1946 the Church of Scotland presbytery in Jerusalem submitted a memorandum against the plan, as they feared it would spoil the sanctity of the Sea of Galilee. The suggestion of refilling the Dead Sea through a Mediterranean–Dead Sea Canal was based on earlier approaches and is still of importance.

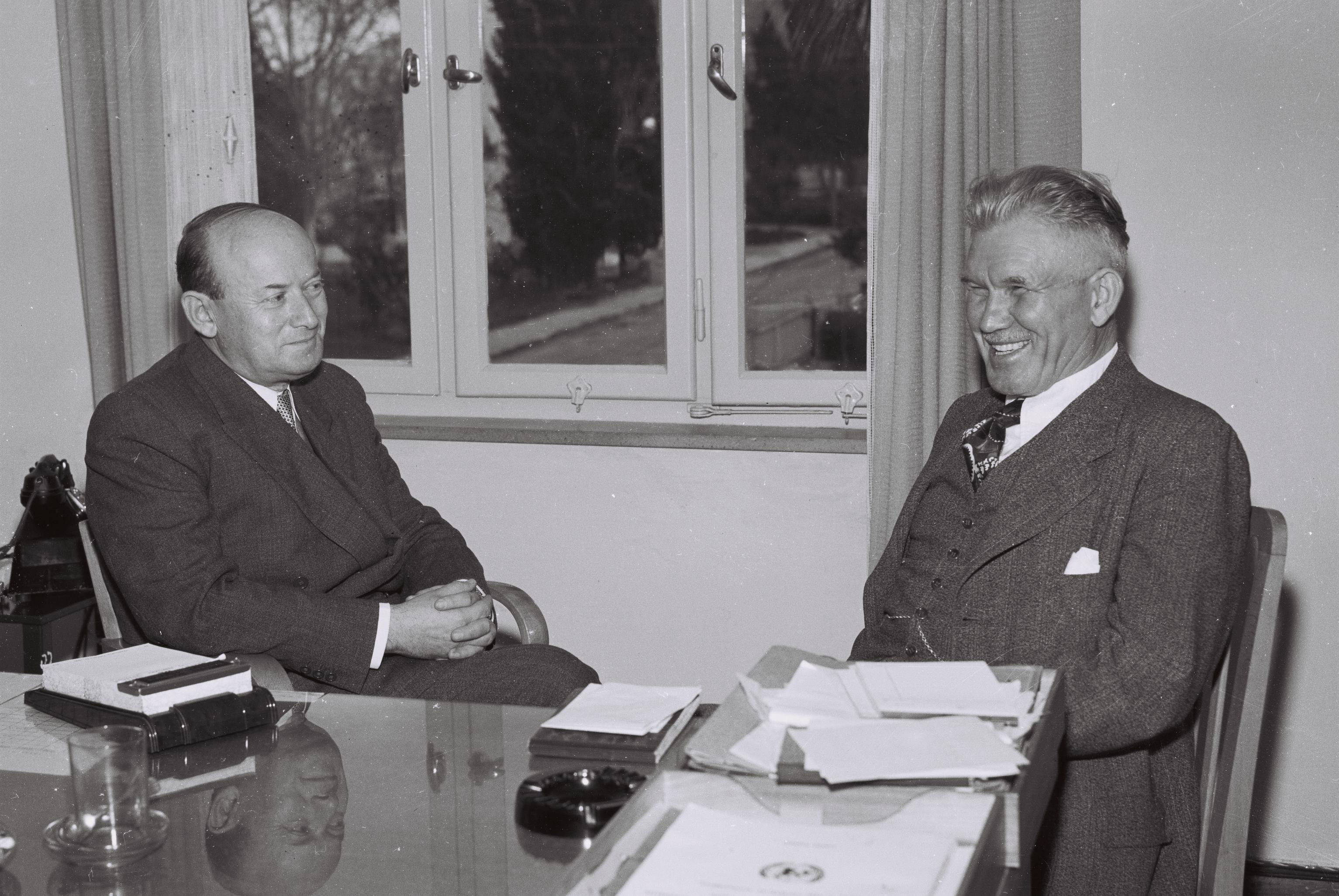
Lowdermilk (right) with Chaim Halperin, Director General of Israeli Ministry of Agriculture 1950

== Honors ==
Lowdermilk Department of Agricultural Engineering at Technion University in Israel is named in his honor, "the world-renowned American expert on soil conservation, who supported the development of the State of Israel, and guided and inspired this Department from its first days." He was Fellow of the American Geophysical Union, 1962.
