= Jordan Valley Unified Water Plan =

Water-sharing plan between Israel and its neighbouring Arab states

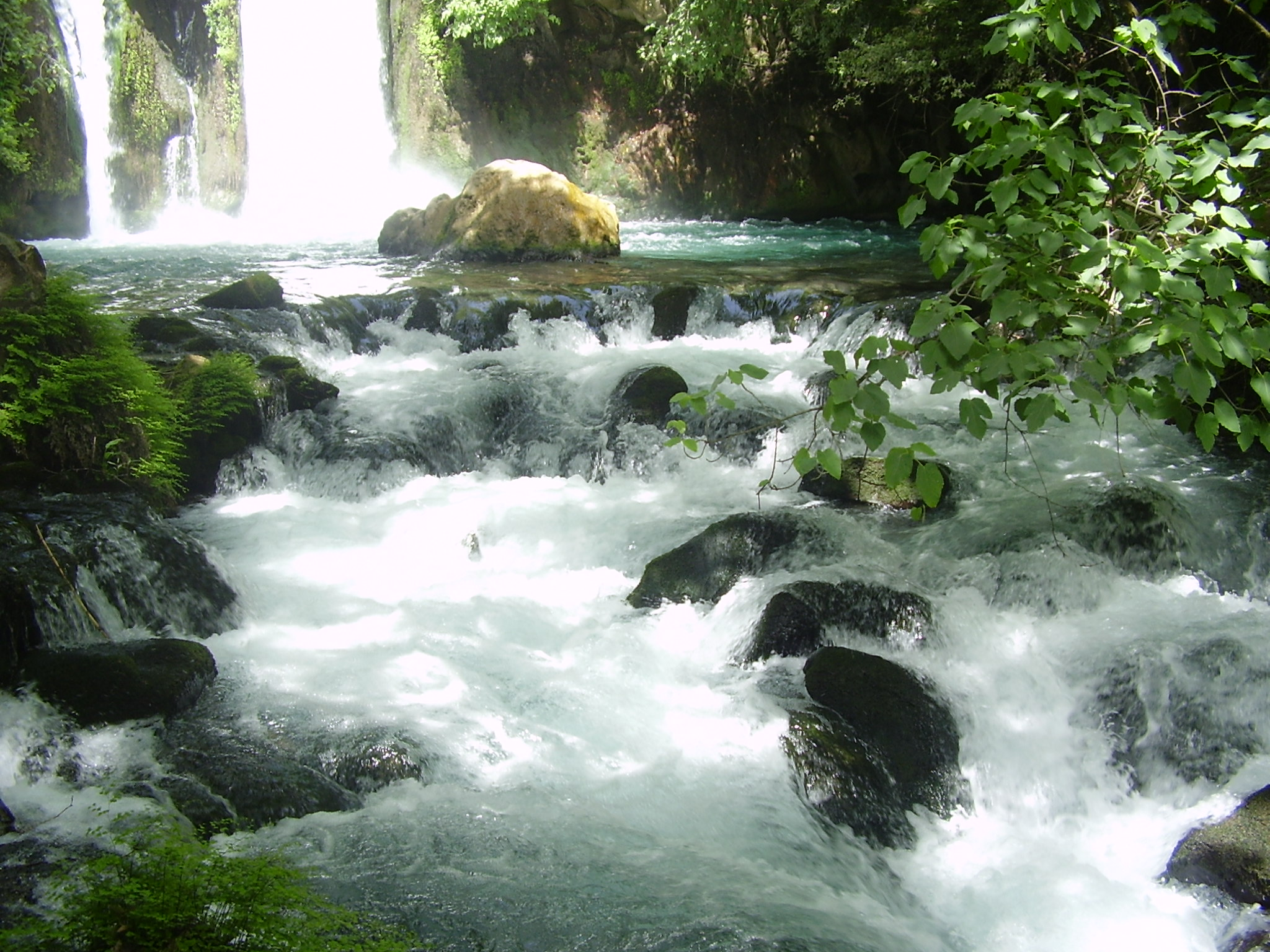
Banias waterfall, Golan Heights

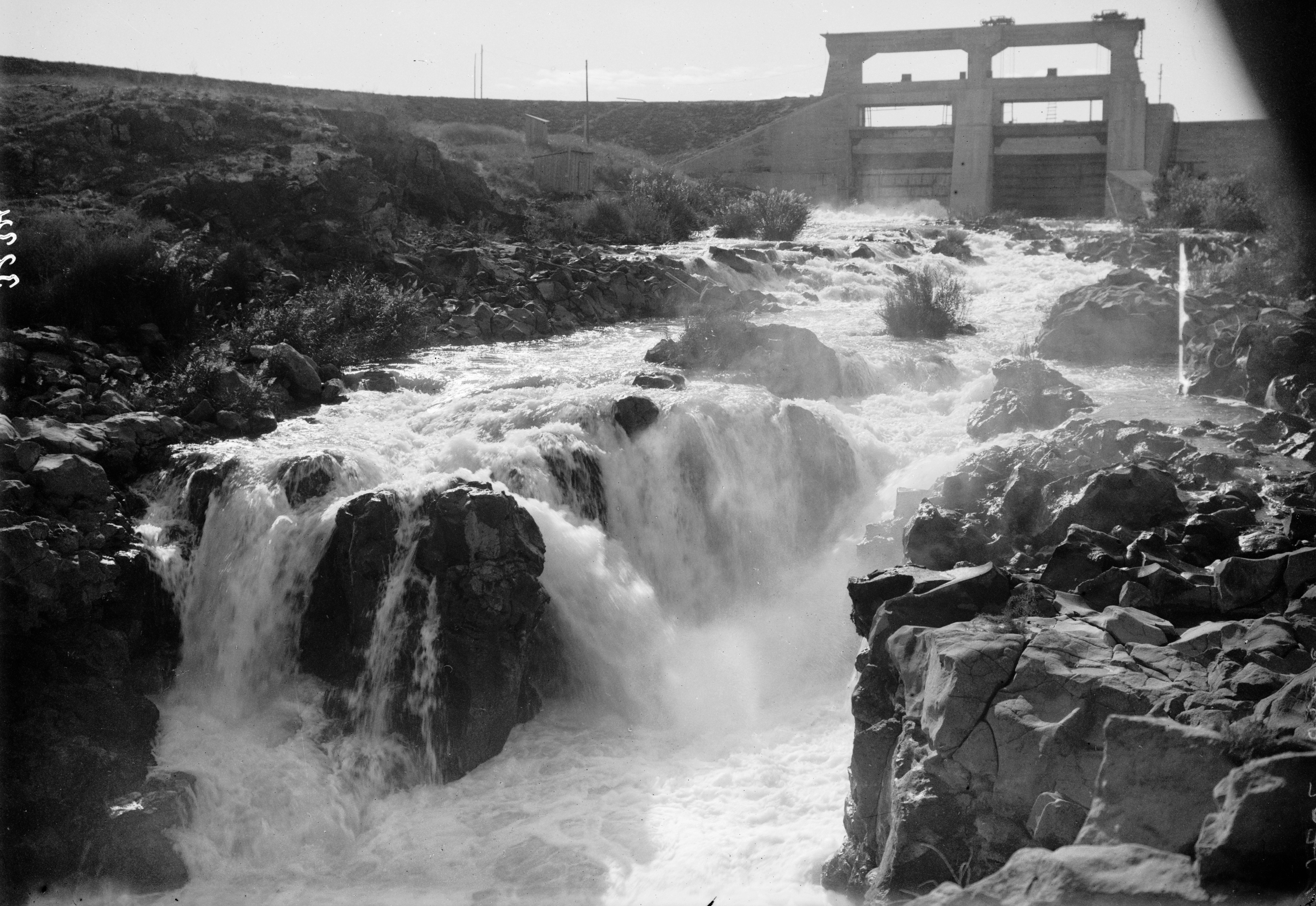
Flood waters exiting from the Yarmuk reservoir to the Yarmuk river, 1933

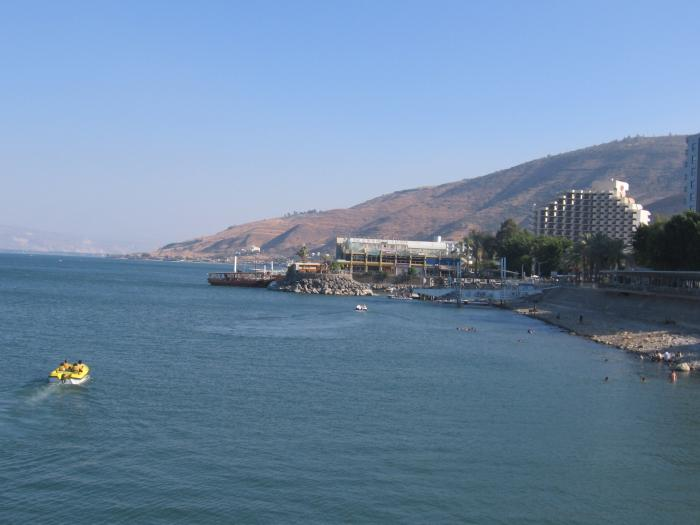
Lake Kinneret, Israel

The Jordan Valley Unified Water Plan, commonly known as the "Johnston Plan", was a plan for the unified water resource development of the Jordan Valley. It was negotiated and developed by United States Special Representative Eric Johnston between 1953 and 1955, and based on an earlier plan commissioned by United Nations Relief and Works Agency for Palestine Refugees in the Near East (UNRWA). Modeled upon the Tennessee Valley Authority's engineered development plan, it was approved by technical water committees of all the regional riparian countries—Israel, Jordan, Lebanon and Syria. Though the plan was rejected by the Arab League, both Israel and Jordan undertook to abide by their allocations under the plan. The US provided funding for Israel's National Water Carrier after receiving assurances from Israel that it would continue to abide by the plan's allocations. Similar funding was provided for Jordan's East Ghor Main Canal project after similar assurances were obtained from Jordan.

== Background ==
In the late 1930s and mid 1940s, Transjordan and the Zionist Organization commissioned mutually exclusive, competing water resource development studies. The Transjordanian study, performed by Michael G. Ionides, concluded that the naturally available water resources were not sufficient to sustain a Jewish homeland and the destination of Jewish immigrants. The Zionist's study, by the American engineer Walter Clay Lowdermilk concluded similarly, but noted that by diverting water from the Jordan River basin to the Negev for support of agricultural and residential development there, a Jewish state with 4 million new immigrants would be sustainable.

In 1953, Israel began construction of a water carrier to take water from the Sea of Galilee to the populated center and agricultural south of the country, while Jordan concluded an agreement with Syria, known as the Bunger plan, to dam the Yarmouk river near Maqarin, and utilize its waters to irrigate Jordanian territory, before they could flow to the Sea of Galilee. Military clashes ensued, and US President Dwight Eisenhower dispatched ambassador Johnston to the region to work out a plan that would regulate water usage.

== CIA Declassified Documents ==
Banat Yacov Project. 7 February 1956:

I. Next foreseeable crisis date in Arab-Israeli situation comes on 1 March, the "deadline" date which Israelis gave Amb. Johnston last autumn for gaining Arab acceptance of Jordan river valley scheme. After 1 March, Israelis told Johnston, they would feel free to go ahead with unilateral Israeli plan for using Jordan Waters.

II. Bone of contention is so-called Banat Yacov project, which takes its name from bridge crossing Jordan River some 8 mi. north of Lake Tiberias (Sea of Galilee).

- Israel wishes to complete canal on western side of Jordan River, running southward from Banat Yacov to Lake Tiberias.
- Objective is stated to be only electric power—diverted water would drop about 800 feet to power-station near Tiberias shore, then flow back into lake.
- Problem—first 1 1/2 mi. of canal must pass through "demilitarized zone" established under the Israeli-Syrian armistice agreement.
  - Syrians maintain (with partial support from UN truce observers) that Israeli project would violate armistice agreement, take water away from Arab landowners in Syria and Jordan.
  - Israelis maintain (also with partial support of UN truce people) they are within legal rights.

III. Question came to UN Security Council shortly after Israelis began work on project over two years ago. (Sep '53).

- In Oct. '53, Security Council passed resolution asking Israel to suspend work on Banat Yacov project while Council considered problem.
- Subsequently, SC Resolution proposing that matter be referred to UN Truce Supervisor was vetoed by USSR.
- No formal action since then: accordingly, SC is still in theory seized with problem, and Israelis have, up to present, held off on work within actual "demilitarized zone" while continuing work on seven-mile stretch within their own territory.

IV. However, Israelis have made their "postponement" of Banat Yacov completion contingent on implementation of Johnston plan.

- Since fall of '53, (when Amb. Johnston made first visit to Middle East) negotiations on Jordan valley scheme have moved slowly.
- In fall of '55, Johnston succeeded in obtaining Arab concurrence in technical aspects—already accepted by Israel: Arabs have balked, however, on political grounds.
  - Although Egyptian prime minister Nasr stated last fall he thought he could bring other Arab states around to acceptance in three or four months, no sign of such activity on his part to date.
- Israeli raid across Tiberias (Dec '55) seems to have killed whatever faint prospect there may have been that Syria or other Arabs would accept Johnston plan in near future.
- Thus 1 March deadline approaching with little or no chance of Arab acceptance Jordan valley scheme.

V. On 31 Jan, Syrian prime minister Ghazzi delivered aide memoirs to US embassy which implied that Syria would use force to prevent Israelis from resuming work on that part of Banat Yacov canal which lies in "demilitarized zone."

- [redacted] .. Syria demarch was coordinated with Egypt.
- Egyptian prime minister Nasr has stated he will support Syria militarily if hostilities break out over Jordan water issue.
- Egypt and Syria have formal military pact, and recent Egyptian troop movements (massing armor in eastern Sinai peninsula) suggest Egypt may be preparing for worst, in expectation it may be called on to fulfill commitment to Syria over water issue.

VI. However, Israelis have given intimations recently that "deadline" does not necessarily mean they will resume Banat Yacov work on or immediately after 1 March.

- Seems more likely that Israelis would first call for review of problem by UN truce supervisor (Gen. Burns) --and implicitly by US, UK and Franco, the "guarantors" of peace in the area.
- Israelis nevertheless probably will not wait too much longer to get issue resolved.
- If they cannot do it by diplomacy, they might take chance that Syrians are bluffing, and go ahead anyway.

UN Sec. Gen Hammarskjold after visit to Palestine in January told American officials he felt Banat Yacov issue Syria would fight on. he felt Israel wrong if forced this issue and he and Gen. Burns agreed they would take strong stand against unilateral action by Israel at Banat Yacov.

== Plan ==
Eisenhower appointed Eric Johnston as a special ambassador on 16 October 1953, and tasked him with mediating a comprehensive plan for the regional development of the Jordan River system. As a starting point, Johnston used a plan commissioned by UNRWA and performed by the American consulting firm Chas. T. Main, known as the "Main Plan". The Main Plan, published just days before Johnston's appointment, utilized the same principles employed by the Tennessee Valley Authority to optimize the usage of an entire river basin as a single unit.

The plan was based on principles similar to those embodied in the Marshall Plan – reducing the potential for conflict by promoting cooperation and economic stability.

The main features of the plan were:

- a dam on the Hasbani River to provide power and irrigate the Galilee area
- dams on the Dan and Banias Rivers to irrigate Galilee
- drainage of the Huleh swamps
- a dam at Maqarin on the Yarmouk River for water storage (capacity of 175 million m³) and power generation,
- a small dam at Addassiyah on the Yarmouk to divert its water toward both the Sea of Galilee and south along the eastern Ghor
- a small dam at the outlet of Sea of Galilee to increase the lake's storage capacity
- gravity-flow canals along the east and west sides of the Jordan valley to irrigate the area between the Yarmouk's confluence with the Jordan and the Dead Sea
- control works and canals to utilize perennial flows from the wadis that the canals cross.

The initial plan gave preference to in-basin use of the Jordan waters, and ruled out integration of the Litani River in Lebanon. The proposed quotas were: Israel 394 million m³, Jordan 774 million m³, and Syria 45 million m³.

Both sides countered with proposals of their own. Israel demanded the inclusion of the Litani river in the pool of available sources, the use of the Sea of Galilee as the main storage facility, out-of-basin use of the Jordan waters, and the Mediterranean-Dead Sea canal. As well, Israel demanded more than doubling of its allocation, from 394 million m³ annually to 810 million m³.

The Arabs countered with a proposal based on the Ionides, MacDonald and Bunger plans, meaning exclusive in-basin use, and rejecting storage in the Sea of Galilee. As well, they demanded recognition of Lebanon as a riparian state, while excluding the Litani from the plan. Their proposed quota allocations were: Israel 200 million m³, Jordan 861 million m³, Syria 132 million m³ and Lebanon 35 million m³ per year.

Negotiations ensued, and gradually the differences were eliminated. Israel dropped the request to integrate the Litani, and the Arabs dropped their objection to out-of-basin use of waters. Ultimately the unified plan proposed the following allocations, by source:

Source	Lebanon	Syria	Jordan	Israel
Hasbani	35			
Banias		20		
Jordan (main stream)		22	100	375
Yarmouk		90	377	25
Side wadis			243	
Total	35	132	720	400

The Plan was accepted by the technical committees from both Israel and the Arab League. A discussion in the Knesset in July 1955 ended without a vote. The Arab Experts Committee approved the plan in September 1955 and referred it for final approval to the Arab League Council. On 11 October 1955, the Council voted not to ratify the plan, due to the League's opposition to formal recognition of Israel. However, the Arab League committed itself to adhere to the technical details without providing official approval.

== Later developments ==
After the Suez Crisis in 1956, however, Arab attitudes hardened considerably, and the Arab League, with the exception of Jordan, now actively opposed the Johnston plan, arguing that any plan to strengthen the Israeli economy only increased the potential threat from Israel. Regardless, both Jordan and Israel undertook to operate within their allocations, and two major successful projects were completed – the Israeli National Water Carrier and Jordan's East Ghor Main Canal (now known as the King Abdullah Canal). Both projects were partially funded by the United States, after Israel and Jordan provided assurances they would abide by their allocations. In 1965, President Nasser assured the American undersecretary of state, Philip Talbot, that the Arabs would not exceed the water quotas prescribed by the Johnston plan. At this point, the other Arab states resolved to reduce the operation of Israel's National Water Carrier by diverting the headwaters of the Jordan, leading to a series of military clashes which would help precipitate the 1967 Six-Day War.
