= Origins of the Six-Day War =

Issues that led to the 1967 Arab–Israeli War

The Six-Day War, or the 1967 Arab–Israeli War, was fought between June 5 and June 10, 1967, by Israel and the neighboring states of Egypt (known then as the United Arab Republic, UAR), Jordan, and Syria. The origins of the war include both longstanding and immediate issues. At the time of the war, the earlier foundation of Israel, the resulting Palestinian refugee issue, and Israel's participation in the invasion of Egypt during the Suez Crisis of 1956 continued to be significant grievances for the Arab world. Arab nationalists, led by Egyptian President Gamal Abdel Nasser, continued to be hostile to Israel's existence and made grave threats against its Jewish population. By the mid-1960s, relations between Israel and its Arab neighbors had deteriorated to the extent that a number of border clashes had taken place.

In April 1967, Syria shot at an Israeli tractor ploughing in the demilitarized zone, which escalated to a prewar aerial clash. In May 1967, following misinformation about Israeli intentions provided by the Soviet Union, Egypt expelled UN peacekeepers who had been stationed in the Sinai Peninsula since the Suez conflict, and announced a blockade of Israel's access to the Red Sea (international waters) via the Straits of Tiran, which Israel considered an act of war. Tension escalated, with both sides' armies mobilising. Less than a month later, Israel launched a surprise strike which began the Six-Day War.

The conventional view has long suggested that Israel's actions leading into the war were prudent, laying the blame for the war on Egypt. According to political scientist Zeev Maoz, most scholarly studies now attribute the crisis to a complicated process of unwanted escalation, which all sides wanted to prevent, but for which all were ultimately responsible. Nasser knew that his blockade of the Straits of Tiran from Israeli vessel passage, on 23 May 1967, might very likely provide Israel with reason to launch an attack. His decisions to ask for the removal of the UN peacekeepers from Sinai and especially to block the Gulf of Aqaba to Israeli shipping via the Straits of Tiran are commonly accepted as the point where war became inevitable. Many commentators consider the war as the classic case of anticipatory attack in self-defense, but some 21st century historians contest the view that Israel acted in self-defense.

== Summary of events leading to war ==
After the 1956 Suez Crisis, Egypt agreed to the stationing of a United Nations Emergency Force (UNEF) in the Sinai to ensure all parties would comply with the 1949 Armistice Agreements. Despite the overwhelming support for Resolution 1000 in the UN General Assembly (UNGA), Israel refused to allow UNEF forces onto its territory. In the following years, there were numerous minor border clashes between Israel and its Arab neighbors, particularly Syria. In early November, 1966, Syria signed a mutual defense agreement with Egypt. On November 13, 1966, in response to PLO (Palestine Liberation Organization) guerrilla activity, including a mine attack that left three dead, the Israeli Defence Force (IDF) attacked the village of as-Samu in the Jordanian-occupied West Bank. Jordanian units that engaged the Israelis were quickly beaten back. King Hussein of Jordan criticized Egyptian President Gamal Abdel Nasser for failing to come to Jordan's aid, and "hiding behind UNEF skirts". Israel was censured for this invasion in United Nations Security Council Resolution 228, being reproached by the US, the UK, France and the USSR. On April 7, 1967, tensions between Israel and Syria escalated into a major military engagement after Syrian forces fired on an Israeli tractor in the demilitarized zone. This led to a large-scale air battle in which the Israeli Air Force shot down six Syrian MiG-21 fighter jets, some over Damascus. In May 1967, Nasser received false reports from the Soviet Union that Israel was massing on the Syrian border.

Nasser began massing his troops in the Sinai Peninsula on Israel's border (May 16), expelled the UNEF force from Gaza and Sinai (May 19) and took up UNEF positions at Sharm el-Sheikh, overlooking the Straits of Tiran. Israel reiterated declarations made in 1957 that any closure of the Straits would be considered an act of war, or justification for war. Nasser declared the Straits closed to Israeli shipping on May 22–23. On May 30, Jordan and Egypt signed a defense pact. The following day, at Jordan's invitation, the Iraqi army began deploying troops and armored units in Jordan. They were later reinforced by an Egyptian contingent. On June 1, Israel formed a National Unity Government by widening its cabinet, and on June 4 the decision was made to go to war. The next morning, Israel launched Operation Focus, a large-scale surprise air strike that launched the Six-Day War.

== Territorial, water ways and water resources disputes ==
=== Territorial disputes ===
The peace accord at the end of the 1948 war had established demilitarized zones (DMZs) between Israel and Syria. However, as recalled by UN military forces officers such as Odd Bull and Carl von Horn, Israelis gradually took over portions of the zone, evicting Arab villagers and demolishing their homes; these actions incurred protests from the UN Security Council. Moshe Dayan, the Israeli defense minister at the time of the Six Day War, recounted in a 1976 interview that Israeli policy in the Demilitarized Zone between 1949 and 1967 was "to seize some territory and hold it until the enemy despairs and gives it to us", thus changing "the lines of the ceasefire accord with military actions that were less than a war". Dayan related further that in the process Israel had provoked more than 80% of the border clashes with Syria in the lead-up to its April 7, 1967 invasion of Syria. In defense of the Israeli actions historian Michael Oren said that "[t]here is an element of truth to Dayan's claim", but that Israeli actions were justified, as "Israel regarded the de-militarized zones in the north as part of their sovereign territory". Gluska qualified this view by pointing out that such Israeli sovereignty over all of the DMZ "was not sanctioned by the UN". In fact the Israeli view had been rejected in 1951 by both Britain and the UN Security council (in Resolution 93). In January 1967 Israel reverted to claiming sovereignty over the DMZ.

Publicly, Syria claimed that the escalating conflict was the result of Israel attempting to increase tension in order to justify a large-scale military operation against Syria, and to expand its occupation of the Demilitarized Zone by dispossessing the remaining Arab farmers.

According to Moshe Shemesh, a historian and former senior intelligence officer in the IDF, Jordan's military and civilian leaders estimated that Israel's main objective was conquest of the West Bank. They felt that Israel was striving to drag all of the Arab countries into a war. After the Samu raid, these apprehensions became the deciding factor in Jordan's decision to participate in the war. King Hussein was convinced Israel would try to occupy the West Bank whether Jordan went to war, or not.

=== Straits of Tiran ===
On May 23, 1967, Egypt (UAR) announced the closure of the Straits of Tiran to all Israeli flagged vessels, as well as to all vessels containing strategic materials bound for Israel: "The Israeli flag shall not go through the gulf" said UAR President Nasser.

=== Water dispute ===
The Johnston Plan was a plan for the unified water resource development of the Jordan Valley, sponsored by UNRWA and accepted by the main Arab leader, Nasser, and by Jordan and Israel. In 1964, Israel began drawing water from the Jordan River for its National Water Carrier, in accordance with the Johnston Plan, reducing the flow that reached Hashemite territory to the Johnston Plan allocation. In January 1964 an Arab League summit meeting convened in Cairo, claimed that the diversion of the Jordan waters by Israel multiplies the dangers to Arab existence and decided to deprive Israel of 35% of the National Water Carrier capacity, by a diversion of the Jordan River headwaters (both the Hasbani and the Banias tributaries) to the Yarmouk River, although the scheme was only marginally feasible, it was technically difficult and expensive. The following year, the Arab states began construction of the Headwater Diversion Plan, which, once completed, would divert the waters of the Banias Stream before the water entered Israel and the Sea of Galilee, to flow instead into a dam at Mukhaiba for use by Jordan and Syria, and divert the waters of the Hasbani into the Litani River in Lebanon. The diversion works would have reduced the installed capacity of Israel's carrier by about 35%, and Israel's overall water supply by about 11%.

The Israel Defense Forces (IDF) attacked the diversion works in Syria in March, May, and August 1965, perpetuating a prolonged chain of border violence that linked directly to the events leading to war.

== Events during the years before the war ==
=== Israel and the Arab states ===
At the time, no Arab state had recognized Israel. Syria, aligned with the Soviet bloc, began sponsoring guerrilla raids on Israel in the early 1960s as part of its "people's war of liberation", designed to deflect domestic opposition to the Ba'ath Party.

Speaking to the UN General Assembly in September 1960, Nasser had stated that "The only solution to Palestine is that matters should return to the condition prevailing before the error was committed — i.e., the annulment of Israel's existence." In 1964 he said, "We swear to God that we shall not rest until we restore the Arab nation to Palestine and Palestine to the Arab nation. There is no room for imperialism and there is no room for Britain in our country, just as there is no room for Israel within the Arab nation." In 1965 he asserted, "We shall not enter Palestine with its soil covered in sand, we shall enter it with its soil saturated in blood."

Even after nearly two decades of its existence, no neighboring Arab country of Israel was willing to negotiate a peace agreement with Israel or accept its existence. Tunisian President Habib Bourguiba suggested in a speech in Jericho in 1965 that the Arab world should face reality and negotiate with Israel, but this was rejected by the other Arab countries.

=== Israel and Egypt: Suez Crisis aftermath ===
The Suez Crisis of 1956 represented a military defeat but a political victory for Egypt, and set the stage leading to the Six-Day War. In a speech delivered to the Knesset, David Ben-Gurion said that the 1949 armistice agreement with Egypt was dead and buried, and that the armistice lines were no longer valid and could not be restored. Under no circumstances would Israel agree to the stationing of UN forces on its territory or in any area it occupied. Heavy diplomatic pressure from both the United States and the Soviet Union forced Israel into a conditional withdrawal of its military from the Sinai Peninsula, only after satisfactory arrangements had been made with the international force that was about to enter the canal zone.

After the 1956 war, Egypt agreed to the stationing of a UN peacekeeping force in the Sinai, the United Nations Emergency Force, to keep that border region demilitarized, and prevent Palestinian fedayeen guerrillas from crossing the border into Israel.

As a result, the border between Egypt and Israel remained quiet for the vast majority of the period up to 1967.

After the 1956 war, the region returned to an uneasy balance without resolution of any of the underlying issues.

=== Israel and Egypt: Rotem Crisis ===
In February 1960, tensions along the Israeli–Syrian border prompted Nasser to deploy Egyptian armed forces in northern Sinai. Only six days after troop movements had begun, did Israel learn of the presence of an Egyptian force, numbering around 500 tanks, on its undefended southern border. Caught off-guard, Israel scrambled to deploy its own forces, while Ben-Gurion adopted a policy of pacification to ease tensions and prevent the outbreak of hostilities.

Both sides eventually stood down, yet each drew different conclusions from the affair. Israeli national defence policy came to see any mass deployment of Egyptian forces on its border as unacceptable, and believed new rules had been set in place. Egypt, however, viewed the crisis as a great success. Egypt believed the deployment had prevented an Israeli attack on Syria, and it was thus possible to deter Israel with the mere deployment of forces, without the danger of going to war. The crisis was to have a direct effect on both sides during the events of May 1967, which eventually led to the Six-Day War. Both Israel and Egypt applied the lessons they had learned in the earlier affair. Indeed, these were at first perceived to be a repeat of the Rotem affair, and were expected to follow the same course. Major differences however gave the new crisis its own momentum and eventually led to war.

== Events during the months before the war ==
=== Israel and Jordan: Samu incident ===
The long armistice line between Jordan and Israel was tense since the beginning of Fatah's guerrilla operations in January 1965. While Syria supported such operations, Egypt and Jordan refused to let PLO guerrillas operate from their territory. After 1965 the majority of raids on Israel originated from the Syrian border. Israel viewed the state from which the raids were perpetrated as responsible. King Hussein, the Hashemite ruler, was in a bind: he did not want to appear as cooperating with Israel in light of the delicate relationship of his government with the majority Palestinian population in his kingdom, and his success in preventing such raids was only partial. In the summer and autumn of 1966 the PLO carried out several guerrilla attacks that caused death and injury to Israeli civilians and military personnel. This culminated on November 11, 1966, when an Israeli border patrol hit a land mine, killing three soldiers and injuring six others. Israel believed the mine had been planted by militants from Es Samu, a village in the southern West Bank, close to where the incident took place, which was a Fatah stronghold. This led the Israeli cabinet to approve a large scale operation called 'Shredder'. On Friday, November 12, King Hussein of Jordan penned a letter of personal condolence to Israel which he cabled to U.S. ambassador to Israel, Walworth Barbour, through the U.S. embassy in Amman which passed it to Barbour in Tel Aviv. Barbour, believing there was no urgency to delivering the letter, left it on his desk over the weekend, thus failing to deliver it in a timely fashion.

The next day, on the morning of November 13, the Israel Defense Forces invaded Jordan, crossing the border into the West Bank and attacked Es Samu. The attacking force consisted of 3,000 to 4,000 soldiers backed by tanks and aircraft. They were divided into a reserve force, which remained on the Israeli side of the border, and two raiding parties, which crossed into the West Bank.

The larger force of eight Centurion Tanks, followed by 400 paratroopers mounted in 40 open-topped half-tracks and 60 engineers in 10 more half-tracks, headed for Samu; while a smaller force of three tanks and 100 paratroopers and engineers in 10 half-tracks headed towards two smaller villages: Kirbet El-Markas and Kirbet Jimba. According to Terence Prittie's Eshkol: The Man and the Nation, 50 houses were destroyed, but the inhabitants had been evacuated hours before.

To Israel's surprise, the Jordanian military intervened. The 48th Infantry Battalion of the Jordanian Army ran into the Israeli forces northwest of Samu; and two companies approaching from the northeast were intercepted by the Israelis, while a platoon of Jordanians armed with two 106 mm recoilless guns entered Samu. The Jordanian Air Force intervened as well and a Jordanian Hunter fighter was shot down in the action. In the ensuing battles, three Jordanian civilians and 16 soldiers were killed; 54 other soldiers and 96 civilians were wounded. The commander of the Israeli paratroop battalion, Colonel Yoav Shaham, was killed and 10 other Israeli soldiers were wounded.

According to the Israeli government, 50 Jordanians were killed, but the true number was never disclosed by the Jordanians, in order to keep up morale and confidence in King Hussein's regime. The whole battle was short: the Israeli forces crossed the ceasefire line at 6:00 a.m. and returned by 10:00 a.m.

==== Samu incident consequences ====
Hussein felt betrayed by the operation which shattered the fragile trust between Israel and Jordan. He had been having secret meetings with Israeli foreign ministers Abba Eban and Golda Meir for three years. According to him he was doing everything he could to stop guerrilla attacks from the West Bank and Jordan. "I told them I could not absorb a serious retaliatory raid, and they accepted the logic of this and promised there would never be one".

Two days later, in a memo to U.S. President Lyndon B. Johnson, his Special Assistant Walt Rostow wrote: "retaliation is not the point in this case. This 3000-man raid with tanks and planes was out of all proportion to the provocation and was aimed at the wrong target," and went on to describe the damage done to US and Israeli interests:

They've wrecked a good system of tacit cooperation between Hussein and the Israelis... They've undercut Hussein. We've spent $500 million to shore him up as a stabilizing factor on Israel's longest border and vis-à-vis Syria and Iraq. Israel's attack increases the pressure on him to counterattack not only from the more radical Arab governments and from the Palestinians in Jordan but also from the Army, which is his main source of support and may now press for a chance to recoup its Sunday losses... They've set back progress toward a long term accommodation with the Arabs... They may have persuaded the Syrians that Israel didn't dare attack Soviet-protected Syria but could attack US-backed Jordan with impunity.

The United Nations Security Council adopted Resolution 228 unanimously deploring "the loss of life and heavy damage to property resulting from the action of the Government of Israel on 13 November 1966", censuring "Israel for conducting "a large-scale and carefully planned military action against Jordanian territory" in violation of the United Nations Charter and of the General Armistice Agreement between Israel and Jordan" and emphasizing "to Israel that actions of military reprisal cannot be tolerated and that, if they are repeated, the Security Council will have to consider further and more effective steps as envisaged in the Charter to ensure against the repetition of such acts."

Facing a storm of criticism from Jordanians, Palestinians, and his Arab neighbors for failing to protect Samu, Hussein ordered a nationwide mobilization on November 20. Hussein complained that Egypt and Syria had failed to protect the West Bank, while "hiding behind UNEF skirts"; this accusation may have been a factor in Nasser's decision to rid his country of the UNEF force on the eve of the Six-Day War.

This was the largest scale operation that Israel had been involved with since the Suez Crisis. While the diplomatic and political developments were not as Israel expected, following the operation Hussein worked hard to avoid any further clashes by preventing guerrilla operations from being launched from within Jordan.

Some view the Samu attack as the beginning of the escalation in tensions that led to the war, with others going further to describe it as the first step in the prelude to war.

=== Israel and Syria ===
Overall, Oren's account of the period portrays Israel as the innocent victim of Syrian provocation and aggression. From the Golan Heights, Syrians had shelled Israeli settlements and other targets, such as fishermen in the Sea of Galilee, drawing punitive responsive strikes from Israel. In addition, following the 1966 Syrian coup d'état, attacks and acts of sabotage by Syrian-based Palestinian guerrillas (Fatah) had increased, although Jordan was still the main source. For two and a half years from the start of the attacks up until the Israeli invasion of Syria on April 7, 1967, the Fatah incursions launched from Syrian territory had resulted in three Israeli deaths, all of them soldiers. In September 1966 the Israeli Chief of Staff Yitzhak Rabin gave an interview in which he stated that Israeli actions "should be aimed at those who carry out the attacks and at the regime that supports them". These 'unfortunate' words were interpreted as a 'plot' to bring down the Syrian government.

In November 1966, Egypt and Syria signed a defense pact whereby each country would support the other if it were attacked. According to Indar Jit Rikhye, Egyptian Foreign Minister Mahmoud Riad told him that the Soviet Union had persuaded Egypt to enter the pact with two ideas in mind: to reduce the chances of a punitive attack on Syria by Israel, and to bring the Syrians under Egyptian President Gamal Abdel Nasser's moderating influence. In January 1967 the Israeli Minister of Health, Yisrael Barzilai, warned that Egypt's commitment to Syria under their mutual defense pact "could escalate the situation and nobody foresee how it will end".

During a visit to London in February 1967, Israeli Foreign Minister Abba Eban briefed journalists on Israel's "hopes and anxieties" explaining to those present that, although the governments of Lebanon, Jordan and the United Arab Republic (Egypt's official name until 1971) seemed to have decided against active confrontation with Israel, it remained to be seen whether Syria could maintain a minimal level of restraint at which hostility was confined to rhetoric. At the same time Israel was planning, approving and executing the provocations of Syria along the DMZ referred to by Dayan. The provocations were sending a tractor to plow in the demilitarized areas. The Syrians would fire on these tractors and would frequently shell Israeli settlements. This reached a critical point when armored tractor work on land in the southern demilitarized zone close to Kibbutz Ha-On was scheduled. It was anticipated that the Syrians would react. The Israeli Air Force was placed on alert. Prime Minister Eshkol approved the plan.

==== April 7, 1967 cross-border battle ====
Earlier in the week, Syria had twice attacked an Israeli tractor working in the DMZ area. When the tractor returned on the morning of April 7, 1967, as predicted in the plan, the Syrians opened fire again initially with light weapons. The Israelis responded by sending in armor-plated tractors to continue ploughing, resulting in further exchanges of fire. The resulting tit-for-tat escalated, leading to tanks, heavy mortars, machine guns, and artillery being used in various sections along the 47 mile (76 km) border in what was described as "a dispute over cultivation rights in the demilitarized zone south-east of Lake Tiberias." At this point the critical departure from previous incidents occurred. Without advance planning nor having been submitted for prior approval to the Ministerial Committee on Security, Israeli aircraft dive-bombed Syrian positions with 250 and 500 kg bombs. For the first time the IAF was employed before an Israeli settlement had actually been shelled (with the exception of stray shells which fell in Tel Katzir) and Israeli planes penetrated as far as Damascus. The Syrians then responded by shelling Israeli border settlements heavily, and Israeli jets retaliated by bombing the village of Sqoufiye, destroying around 40 houses in the process. At 15:19 Syrian shells started falling on Kibbutz Gadot; over 300 landed within the kibbutz compound in 40 minutes. The "incident" had escalated into a full-scale aerial battle over the Golan Heights after Israel scrambled jets, resulting in the loss of six Syrian Air Force MiG-21s to Israeli Air Force Dassault Mirage IIIs, and the latter's flight over Damascus. The United Nations Truce Supervision Organization (UNTSO) attempted to arrange a ceasefire, but Syria declined to co-operate unless Israeli agricultural work was halted. The Israeli newspaper Maariv wrote "This was not an 'incident' but a real war." Under these circumstances, the Soviet Union intervened to halt the downward course of events and to deter Israel by activating the Egyptian–Syrian defense pact signed in November 1966 under Soviet pressure for this precise purpose.

Although the April 7 cross-border battle is often called an 'incident', various reactions to the event belie this description. The Israeli press called it a war. Moshe Dayan was reported by Ezer Weismann to have responded "Have you lost your minds? You are leading the country to war!" Brigadier-General Israel Lior agreed: "From my point of view, the Six-Day War had begun." On April 21, 1967 as in May 1966. the Soviet deputy foreign minister, Yaakov Malik, relayed an oral message to the Israeli ambassador in Moscow: "The government of the Soviet Union sees the need to warn again the government of Israel that the hazardous policy it has been waging for several years is fraught with danger, and [Israel] will be held solely responsible.

==== Later developments ====
Speaking to a Mapai party meeting in Jerusalem on May 11 Prime Minister of Israel Levi Eshkol warned that Israel would not hesitate to use air power on the scale of 7 April in response to continued border terrorism, and on the same day Israeli envoy Gideon Rafael presented a letter to the president of the Security Council warning that Israel would "act in self-defense as circumstances warrant". Writing from Tel Aviv on May 12, James Feron reported that some Israeli leaders had decided to use force against Syria "of considerable strength but of short duration and limited in area" and quoted "one qualified observer" who "said it was highly unlikely that Egypt (then officially called United Arab Republic), Syria's closest ally in the Arab world, would enter the hostilities unless the Israeli attack were extensive". In early May the Israeli cabinet authorized a limited strike against Syria, but Rabin's renewed demand for a large-scale strike to discredit or topple the Ba'ath regime was opposed by Eshkol. BBC journalist Jeremy Bowen reports:

The toughest threat was reported by the news agency United Press International (UPI) on 12 May: 'A high Israeli source said today that Israel would take limited military action designed to topple the Damascus army regime if Syrian terrorists continue sabotage raids inside Israel. Military observers said such an offensive would fall short of all-out war but would be mounted to deliver a telling blow against the Syrian government.' In the West as well as the Arab world the immediate assumption was that the unnamed source was Rabin and that he was serious. In fact, it was Brigadier-General Aharon Yariv, the head of military intelligence, and the story was overwritten. Yariv mentioned 'an all-out invasion of Syria and conquest of Damascus' but only as the most extreme of a range of possibilities. But the damage had been done. Tension was so high that most people, and not just the Arabs, assumed that something much bigger than usual was being planned against Syria.

Border incidents multiplied and numerous Arab leaders, both political and military, called for an end to Israeli attacks. Egypt, then already trying to seize a central position in the Arab world under Nasser, accompanied these declarations with plans to re-militarize the Sinai. Syria shared these views, although it did not prepare for an immediate invasion. The Soviet Union actively backed the military needs of the Arab states.

=== Israel and Egypt ===
In April 1967, after meeting with Nasser, Lucius D. Battle, The U.S ambassador in Egypt reported to Washington that Nasser plans to deflect mounting internal pressure against his regime by creating a foreign policy crisis which could be to heat up the Israeli situation.

== Events during the weeks before the war ==
=== Misinformation from the Soviet Union ===
In 1967, Israeli leaders repeatedly threatened to invade Syria and overthrow the Syrian government if Palestinian guerrilla actions across the border did not cease. In that context, the Soviet Union fed the Syrian government false information in the Spring of 1967 that Israel was planning to invade Syria.

On May 13, a Soviet intelligence report given by Soviet president Nikolai Podgorny to Egyptian vice president Anwar Sadat likewise claimed falsely that Israeli troops were massing along the Syrian border. On May 14, Nasser sent his chief of staff, General Fawzi, to Syria in order to verify the Soviet warning.

=== Egyptian troop build-up in Sinai ===
Egyptian president Nasser was in a difficult position. He had received humiliating rebukes for Egypt's lack of action after the recent Israeli attacks on Jordan and Syria in April 1967. This, combined with Israeli threats to topple the Syrian regime and the Soviet urging that the Syrian-Egyptian defence agreement had thereby been triggered, left Nasser feeling as though he had no option other than to display solidarity with Syria. On 14 May, Nasser began the re-militarization of the Sinai, and concentrated tanks and troops there. This move was reminiscent of what he had done in the Rotem Crisis, although this time it was done openly. Fawzi reported to Nasser that the Soviet alarm about an Israeli plot to attack Syria was baseless, but Nasser continued to pour his divisions into Sinai.

Egyptian Field Marshal Abdel Hakim Amer explained to (Soviet Ambassador) Pozhidaev that the influx of troops into Sinai was for deterrence: "Israel will not risk starting major military actions against Syria, because if it does Egyptian military units, having occupied forward initial positions on this border will immediately move out on the basis of the mutual defense agreement with Syria." On May 16, Ahmed el-Feki, Egypt's under-secretary of state, assured David Nes, US chargé d'affaires in Cairo, that Egypt would not "take the initiative in attacking Israel". But in case of a large-scale Israeli attack against its neighbors, el-Feki said, Egypt would come to their aid. Nes came away from the conversation "certain" that Egypt had "no aggressive intent".

The reasons for Nasser's decisions to expel the UN peacekeepers (UNEF) and the move to reinforce Egyptian forces in the Sinai were reported to the Israeli government by Prime Minister Eshkol on May 16, 1967 as follows:

It is estimated that, in light of Syrian reports and appeals to Egypt regarding Israel’s intention to take major action against Syria; in light of declarations and warnings issued by Israel in the past few days; and Egypt’s predicament since April. Egypt has come to the decision that in the present circumstances it cannot sit by idly. It has therefore decided, in the face of the Israeli threat, to demonstrate readiness to come to Syria’s aid within the framework of the mutual defence pact. At the same time, it may be assumed that the Egyptians hope that their actions and demonstration will achieve the practical effect of deterring Israel from implementing its threat.

=== Removal of U.N. peacekeepers from Egypt ===
At 10:00 p.m. on May 16, the commander of United Nations Emergency Force, General Indar Jit Rikhye, was handed a letter from General Mohammed Fawzy, Chief of Staff of the United Arab Republic, reading: "To your information, I gave my instructions to all UAR armed forces to be ready for action against Israel, the moment it might carry out any aggressive action against any Arab country. Due to these instructions our troops are already concentrated in Sinai on our eastern border. For the sake of complete security of all UN troops which install OPs along our borders, I request that you issue your orders to withdraw all these troops immediately." The emissary who delivered the letter requested immediate withdrawal of United Nations troops from Sharm el Sheikh as well. Rikhye said he would report to the Secretary-General for instructions. (Note: Sources on the expulsion of UN forces: "In 1967, Egypt ordered the UN troops out and blocked Israeli shipping routes — adding to already high levels of tension between Israel and its neighbours." "Israel and the Palestinians in depth, 1967: Six Day War", BBC. Accessed July 17, 2010.; "Buoyed by the almost universal Arab acclaim he received for his actions, Nasser expelled the UNEF forces and announced the closing of the Straits of Tiran" Robert Owen Freedman. World Politics and the Arab-Israeli Conflict, Pergamon Press, 1979, p. 79.; "The Israeli attack ended a nerve-wracking three weeks of waiting... begun when Egyptian President Gamal Abdel Nasser expelled the United Nations peacekeepers from the Gaza Strip and the southern tip of the Sinai Peninsula, blockaded the nearby Straits of Tiran to Israeli ships, and deployed his massive army along the Israeli border." Dan Perry, Alfred Ironside. Israel and the Quest for Permanence, McFarland, 1999, p. 18.; "Soon after Nasser expelled UN forces from the Sinai, Secretary of State Dean Rusk directed State Department officials in Washington, New York, and Moscow to urge the Soviets to restrain their Arab friends." Nigel John Ashton. Cold War in the Middle East: Regional Conflict and the Superpowers 1967–73, Routledge, 2007, p. 18.; "Nasser... closed the Gulf of Aqaba to shipping, cutting off Israel from its primary oil supplies. He told UN peacekeepers in the Sinai Peninsula to leave. He then sent scores of tanks and hundreds of troops into the Sinai closer to Israel. The Arab world was delirious with support," "The Mideast: A Century of Conflict Part 4: The 1967 Six Day War", NPR morning edition, October 3, 2002. Accessed December 28, 2008.; "...a Middle East crisis erupted on May 16, 1967, when Nasser expelled the UN troops that had policed the Sinai since the end of the Suez-Sinai War in 1957." Peter L Hahn. Crisis and Crossfire: The United States and the Middle East Since 1945, Potomac Books, 2005, p. 50.; "In May, 1967 President Nasser expelled UNEF from Egypt and set in train the events that precipitated Israel's blitzkrieg invasion and conquest of the Sinai." JL Granatstein. Canadian Foreign Policy: Historical Readings, Copp Clark Pitman, 1986, p. 236.)

The UNEF was established following the Suez crisis in 1956 by various resolutions of the Security Council culminating in Resolution 1001 (ES-I). Egypt agreed to the presence of the unit on her territory. Israel refused.

Initially, Nasser's letter had not demanded a full withdrawal of UNEF, but that they vacate the Sinai and concentrate in Gaza. Detailed archival studies revealed that the original letter had not included a request to withdraw troops from Sharm el-Sheik, overlooking the Straits of Tiran. The UN Secretary-General, U Thant, demanded an all-or-nothing clarification from Nasser, leaving the Egyptians with little choice but to ask for their total withdrawal. U Thant then attempted to negotiate with the Egyptian government, but on May 18 the Egyptian Foreign Minister informed nations with troops in UNEF that the UNEF mission in Egypt and the Gaza Strip had been terminated and that they must leave immediately. Egyptian forces then prevented UNEF troops from entering their posts. The Governments of India and Yugoslavia decided to withdraw their troops from UNEF, regardless of the decision of U Thant. While this was taking place, U Thant suggested that UNEF be redeployed to the Israeli side of the border, but Israel refused, arguing that UNEF contingents from countries hostile to Israel would be more likely to impede an Israeli response to Egyptian aggression than to stop that aggression in the first place. The Permanent Representative of Egypt then informed U Thant that the Egyptian government had decided to terminate UNEF's presence in the Sinai and the Gaza Strip, and requested steps that would withdraw the force as soon as possible. The UNEF commander was given the order to begin withdrawal on May 19.

The withdrawal of UNEF was to be spaced over a period of some weeks. The troops were to be withdrawn by air and by sea from Port Said. The withdrawal plan envisaged that the last personnel of UNEF would leave the area on June 30, 1967. On the morning of May 27, Egypt demanded that the Canadian contingent be evacuated within 48 hours "on grounds of the attitude adopted by the Government of Canada in connection with UNEF and the United Arab Republic Government's request for its withdrawal, and ‘to prevent any probable reaction from the people of the United Arab Republic against the Canadian Forces in UNEF.’" The withdrawal of the Canadian contingent was accelerated and completed on May 31, with the effect that UNEF was left without its logistics and air support components. In the war itself 15 members of the remaining force were killed and the rest evacuated through Israel.

==== The Egyptian right to remove the U.N. peacekeepers ====
Before UNEF could be deployed in 1956 negotiations were necessary with the compliant host country, Egypt, Israel having refused to host the peacekeepers.

A key principle governing the stationing and functioning of UNEF, and later of all other peacekeeping forces, was the consent of the host Government. Since it was not an enforcement action under Chapter VII of the Charter, UNEF could enter and operate in Egypt only with the consent of the Egyptian Government. This principle was clearly stated by the UNGA in adopting Resolution 1001 (ES-I) of 7 November 1956 concerning the establishment of UNEF. ... The Secretary-General impressed upon those authorities that the Force provided a guarantee for the withdrawal of foreign forces from Egypt and that, since it would come only with Egypt's consent, it could not stay or operate in Egypt if that consent were withdrawn. ... Moreover, because Israel refused to accept UNEF on its territory, the Force had to be deployed only on the Egyptian side of the border, and thus its functioning was entirely contingent upon the consent of Egypt as the host country. Once that consent was withdrawn, its operation could no longer be maintained.

Rostow is of a contrary opinion that "Egyptian commitments of the period were broken one by one, the last being the request for the removal of U.N.E.F." In another publication Rostow adds detail: "One of the most important terms of the agreement was set out in an aide memoire by Secretary-General Dag Hammarskjöld: if Egypt ever tried unilaterally to remove the United Nations peacekeeping forces in the Sinai, or to close the Straits of Tiran, the Secretary-General would call the Security Council into session immediately and block such initiatives until a peaceful resolution of the conflict could be reached." Oren, however, confirms Egypt's right as follows: "That (UNEF) presence, however, hung on a legal fiction. The "good-faith agreement" forged by Dag Hammarskjöld in 1957, according to which Egypt would consult with the General Assembly and the UNEF Advisory Council before altering the force's mandate, was in no way binding. The Egyptians could, in fact, dismiss UNEF whenever they chose. Bunche (UN expert on Middle East diplomacy) fully adhered to the secretary-general's position that Egypt had a sovereign right to dismiss UNEF’, however imprudent that decision might be." Further contrary to Rostow's position, the Secretary-General in 1967, U Thant, specifically addressed the Hammarskjöld memoire during the build-up of tension, declaring that the 1957 memorandum by the late Secretary-General, which had interpreted the agreement on UNEF between the United Nations and Egypt as meaning that an Egyptian request for UNEF withdrawal would have to be referred to the General Assembly, was “a purely private” understanding by Mr. Hammarskjöld and not binding either on the present Secretary-General or on Egypt.

==== International reactions ====
The United States did not find a UNEF withdrawal overly worrying. Walworth Barbour, US ambassador in Tel Aviv, told Israeli officials that the withdrawal did not affect the "fundamental military situation," and that there was "every reason for Nasser" not to attack Israel. Egypt volunteered that if Israel were concerned about an Egyptian invasion, it could accept UNEF on its own side of the armistice line. "If Israel wants them to stay," Field Marshal Amer told Soviet Ambassador Pozhidaev, "it can make its own territory available." U Thant was thinking along the same lines. On May 18, he posed that option to Israel's UN ambassador, Gideon Rafael, as a protection against a possible invasion. Rafael replied that this option was "entirely unacceptable to his Government."

Jacques Roux, France's ambassador in Cairo, gave Maurice Couve de Murville, the French foreign minister, an assessment that Egypt was making its moves in reaction to accusations that Egypt was not living up to its obligations to other Arab states. The request for a UNEF withdrawal did not, in Roux's view, mean that the Egyptian leadership was embarking on "an adventure."

Israel was not particularly troubled by the evacuation of the UNEF in itself. There were some who even thought that it would be to Israel's advantage.

=== The Straits of Tiran closure ===
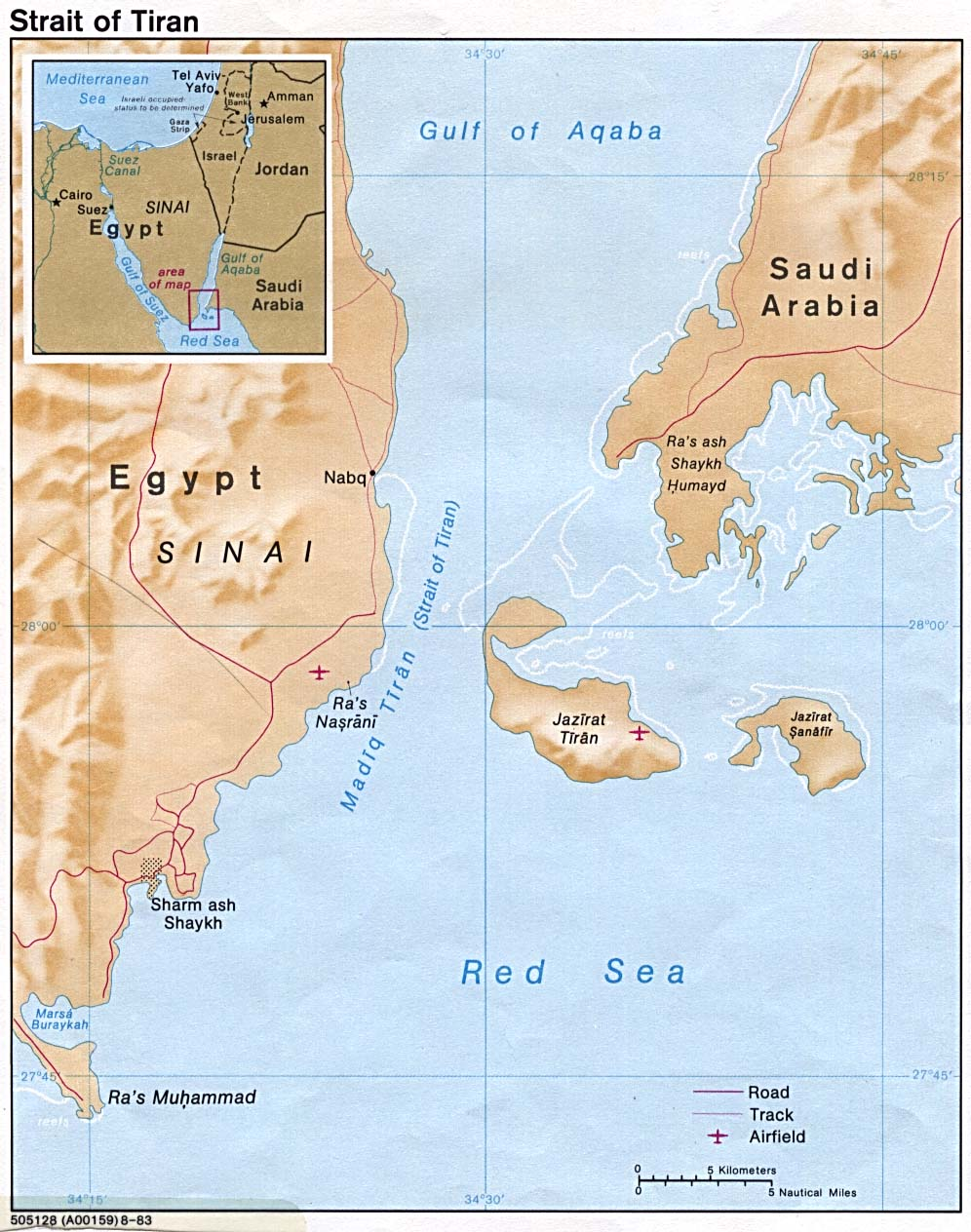

Israeli Prime Minister Eshkol repeated declarations that Israel had made in 1957, saying that closure of the Straits of Tiran would be an act of war. Then, on May 22, Egypt responded by announcing, in addition to the UN withdrawal, that the Straits of Tiran would be closed to "all ships flying Israeli flags or carrying strategic materials", with effect from May 23. In order to enforce the blockade, Egypt falsely announced that the Tiran straits had been mined. 90% of Israeli oil passed through the Straits of Tiran. Oil tankers that were due to pass through the straits were delayed.

According to Sami Sharaf, Minister of State for Presidential Affairs, Nasser knew that the decision to block the Tiran straits made the war "inevitable". Nasser stated, "Under no circumstances can we permit the Israeli flag to pass through the Gulf of Aqaba." The closure of the Tiran Straits was closely linked to the previous withdrawal of the UN peacekeepers, because having the peacekeepers (rather than the Egyptian military) at Sharm el Sheik was important for keeping that waterway open.

In his speech to Arab trade unionists on May 26, Nasser announced: "The problem today is not just Israel, but also those behind it. If Israel embarks on an aggression against Syria or Egypt, the battle against Israel will be a general one and not confined to one spot on the Syrian or Egyptian borders. The battle will be a general one and our basic objective will be to destroy Israel." The historian Raymond Cohen argued that Nasser was making three points here:

1. Israel was not alone and backed by America. Nasser reitereated this point in other parts of the speech where he said "'Today Israel is America", "All the Western powers have adopted Israel's point of view", and "the whole of the West is with Israel". Thus, Nasser was laying the ground work as to why Egypt would not start a war with Israel.
2. War was only going to occur if Israel started it.
3. If Israel was to attack, then Egypt's aim would to destroy Israel.

On the exact same day at three in the morning, the Soviet Ambassador woke Nasser, explaining to him that the Americans had told the USSR that the Israelis had information that Egypt was going to attack first, and that the USSR advises him not to attack first. Nasser told him that he had no plans for an attack. Again, the next day Abba Eban went to the State Department and told Secretary Rusk that “Israel is going to be attacked and destroyed today.” According to journalist and close confidant of Nasser, Mohamed Hassanein Heikal:

Nasser was astonished. He could not understand where the Israelis got their story, because there was no truth in it. However, in order to make his position absolutely clear, he made speeches on May 27 and 29 in which he said: “We are not going to fire the first shot. . . We are not going to start an attack.” He thought that this was like giving a press conference to the world. He was making a public pledge to President Johnson and the Soviet Union not to start a war. It was also his reply to President de Gaulle, who had sent a message asking for restraint and who said he would base his position on who fired the first shot—and he did.

Nasser publicly denied that Egypt would strike first and spoke of a negotiated peace if Israel allowed all Palestinian refugees the right of return, and of a possible compromise over the Straits of Tiran.

=== Rejected Egyptian plan to attack Israel on 27 May ===
Egyptian Field Marshal Amer formulated a plan for initiating an attack on Israel in late May; it was rejected by Nasser who felt that despite the rising tensions, Egypt should not attack Israel unless Israel attacked first. Nasser’s awareness of this plan prior to his rejection of it is debated by other historians.

Oren states that Amer told one of his generals that "This time we will be the ones to start the war." This was counter to Nasser's strategy of pushing Israel to start the war. Oren states that Egyptian sources are divided over why Nasser did not veto Amer's plan. Oren suggests that "Nasser was apprised of [the plan] but lacked the political strength to override Amer's order. Also, the preparation of an Egyptian invasion of Israel had certain advantages for Nasser..." The Egyptian attack plan was code-named Operation Dawn, and was planned by General Abdel Hakim Amer. It called for the strategic bombing of Israeli airfields, ports, cities, and the Negev Nuclear Research Center. Arab armies would then invade Israel, and cut it in half with an armored thrust through the Negev. In a report published by the Wilson Center, Avner Cohen said that one of the reasons for the outbreak of the Six-Day War was that "Israel feared Egyptian strikes on the nuclear reactor in Dimona".

On May 25, 1967, Israeli Foreign Minister Abba Eban landed in Washington "with instructions to discuss American plans to re-open the Straits of Tiran". As soon as he arrived, he was given new instructions in a cable from the Israeli government. The cable said that Israel had learned of an imminent Egyptian attack, which overshadowed the blockade. No longer was he to emphasize the Straits issue; he was instructed to ‘inform the highest authorities of this new threat and to request an official statement from the United States that an attack on Israel would be viewed as an attack on the United States." Historian Michael Oren explains Eban's reaction to the new instructions: "Eban was livid. Unconvinced that Nasser was either determined or even able to attack, he now saw Israelis inflating the Egyptian threat — and flaunting their weakness — in order to extract a pledge that the President, Congress-bound, could never make." He described the cable as an "...act of momentous irresponsibility... eccentric..." which "lacked wisdom, veracity and tactical understanding," and later came to the conclusion that the genesis of the cable was Rabin's indecisive state of mind. According to historian Tom Segev, the instructions sent to Eban in Washington were an attempt to mislead him, and through him president Johnson, to support Israel.

Despite his own skepticism, Eban followed his instructions during his first meeting with Secretary Rusk, Under Secretary Rostow, and Assistant Secretary Lucius Battle. American intelligence experts spent the night analyzing each of the Israeli claims. On May 26, Eban met with United States Secretary of State Dean Rusk, Defense Secretary Robert McNamara, and finally with President Lyndon B. Johnson. In a memo to the President, Rusk rejected the claim of an Egyptian and Syrian attack being imminent, plainly stating "our intelligence does not confirm [the] Israeli estimate". According to declassified documents from the Johnson Presidential Library, President Johnson and other top officials in the administration did not believe war between Israel and its neighbors was necessary or inevitable. "All of our intelligence people are unanimous that if the UAR attacks, you will whip hell out of them", Johnson told Eban during a visit to the White House on May 26. Consequently, Johnson declined to airlift special military supplies to Israel or even to publicly support it. Eban left the White House distraught.

In a lecture given in 2002, Oren said, "Johnson sat around with his advisors and said, ‘What if their intelligence sources are better than ours?’ Johnson decided to fire off a Hotline message to his counterpart in the Kremlin, Alexei Kosygin, in which he said, "We've heard from the Israelis, but we can't corroborate it, that your proxies in the Middle East, the Egyptians, plan to launch an attack against Israel in the next 48 hours. If you don't want to start a global crisis, prevent them from doing that." At 2:30 a.m. on May 27, Soviet Ambassador to Egypt Dimitri Pojidaev knocked on Nasser's door and read him a personal letter from Kosygin in which he said, "We don't want Egypt to be blamed for starting a war in the Middle East. If you launch that attack, we cannot support you."

According to Oren, Nasser knew that Operation Dawn was already set to be launched in only few hours time, at sunrise. His mood soured since he realized that Israel had accessed Egyptian secrets and compromised them. Nasser hurried to an emergency meeting at the headquarters, and told Amer about the exposure of Dawn and asked him to cancel the planned attack. Amer consulted his sources in the Kremlin, and they corroborated the substance of Kosygin's message. Despondent, Amer told the commander of Egypt's air force, Major General Mahmud Sidqi, that the operation was cancelled. The cancellation orders arrived to the pilots when they were already in their planes, awaiting the final go ahead.

According to Hussein el-Shafei, then an Egyptian vice president, as soon as Nasser knew what Amer planned, he cancelled the operation. According to John Quigley, there is thin evidence that there was any Egyptian plan to attack Israel that would actually have been carried out.

Abdel Magid Farid, suggests that Nasser did actually consider the first strike option until early on 27 May, when he was hauled out of bed at mid night by the Soviet Union ambassador (his only source of arms and spare parts) and warned not to precipitate a confrontation. Other evidence, however, suggests he never intended to strike first. Nasser rejected the first strike option as politically impossible as he felt it would provide a pretext for Israel and the U.S., and alienate the Soviets. All of Nasser's plans were based on an assumption the Israelis would strike first.

=== The crisis and diplomacy ===
The Israeli government asked the U.S. and UK to reopen the Straits of Tiran, as they had guaranteed they would in 1957. Harold Wilson's proposal of an international maritime force to quell the crisis was adopted by President Johnson, but received little support, with only Britain and the Netherlands offering to contribute ships. The British cabinet later stated that there was a new balance of power in the Middle East, led by the United Arab Republic, that was A) to the detriment of Israel and the Western powers and B) something Israel was going to have to learn to live with.

United Nations Secretary-General U Thant also went to Cairo to help negotiate an agreement to avoid conflict. UN Secretary General, U Thant, visited Cairo for mediation and a renewed diplomatic effort to solve the crisis. Talks failed as President Nasser kept the straits closed and Israel refused to accept the UN troops on its side of the border.

Most American diplomats who worked in the Middle East were sympathetic to Nasser's views on the Straits, with several of them arguing that the US should ignore both its on-the-record promises to Israel regarding the Straits being open and international law; a few diplomats who were not as impressed by threats from Arab nations advised the Johnson Administration to back the flotilla option as a "show of force" that would forestall war from breaking out.

The US also tried to mediate, and Nasser agreed to send his vice-president to Washington to explore a diplomatic settlement. The meeting did not happen because Israel launched its offensive.

On May 30, Nasser responded to Johnson's request of 11 days earlier and agreed to send his Vice President, Zakkariya Muhieddin, to Washington on June 7 to explore a diplomatic settlement in "precisely the opening the White House had sought".

=== Jordan joins Egypt ===
During May and June the Israeli government had worked hard to keep Jordan out of any war; it was concerned about being attacked on multiple fronts, and did not want to have to deal with the Jordanian West Bank. Israel called upon Jordan numerous times to refrain from hostilities. Israel's own sense of concern regarding Jordan's future role stemmed from the Jordanian control of the West Bank. This put Arab forces just 17 kilometers from Israel's coast, a jump-off point from which a well-coordinated tank assault would likely cut Israel in two within half an hour. Hussein had doubled the size of Jordan's army in the last decade and had US training and arms delivered as recently as early 1967, and it was feared that it could be used by other Arab states as staging grounds for operations against Israel; thus, an attack from the West Bank was always viewed by the Israeli leadership as a threat to Israel's existence.

However, Jordan's King Hussein got caught up in the wave of pan-Arab nationalism preceding the war;^{[g]}. According to Mutawi, Hussein was caught on the horns of a galling dilemma: allow Jordan to be dragged into war and face the brunt of the Israeli response, or remain neutral and risk full-scale insurrection among his own people. Army Commander-in-Chief General Sharif Zaid Ben Shaker warned in a press conference that "If Jordan does not join the war a civil war will erupt in Jordan". However, according to Avi Shlaim, Hussein's actions were prompted by his feelings of Arab nationalism.^{[g]}

An extremely important change took place on May 30, when Jordan signed a mutual defense treaty with Egypt, thereby joining the military alliance already in place between Egypt and Syria. The move surprised both Egyptians and foreign observers, because President Nasser had generally been at odds with Hussein, calling him an "imperialist lackey" just days earlier. Nasser said that any differences between him and Hussein were erased "in one moment" and declared: "Our basic objective will be the destruction of Israel. The Arab people want to fight."

At the end of May 1967, Jordanian forces were given to the command of an Egyptian general, Abdul Munim Riad. On the same day, Nasser proclaimed: "The armies of Egypt, Jordan and Syria are poised on the borders of Israel ... to face the challenge, while standing behind us are the armies of Iraq, Algeria, Kuwait, Sudan and the whole Arab nation. This act will astound the world. Today they will know that the Arabs are arranged for battle, the critical hour has arrived. We have reached the stage of serious action and not of more declarations."

The U.S president envoy reported from Cairo on 30 May that Nasser "cannot and will not retreat" and "he would probably welcome, but not seek, military showdown with Israel".

On June 3, days before the war, Egypt flew to Amman two battalions of commandos tasked with infiltrating Israel's borders and engaging in attacks and bombings so as to draw IDF into a Jordanian front and ease the pressure on the Egyptians. Soviet-made artillery and Egyptian military supplies and crews were also flown to Jordan.

=== Arab states preparations ===
At the same time several other Arab states not bordering Israel, including Iraq, Sudan, Kuwait and Algeria, began mobilizing their armed forces.

Writing from Egypt on June 4, 1967, New York Times journalist James Reston observed: "Cairo does not want war and it is certainly not ready for war. But it has already accepted the possibility, even the likelihood, of war, as if it had lost control of the situation."

President Abdul Rahman Arif of Iraq said that "the existence of Israel is an error which must be rectified. This is an opportunity to wipe out the ignominy which has been with us since 1948". In a press conference, president of the PLO Ahmad Shukeiri said it was "possible and even most likely that" the Palestine Liberation Army would strike first; if the Arabs took Israel, it would be unlikely any Jews would survive.

In May 1967, Hafez al-Assad, then Syria's Defense Minister declared: "Our forces are now entirely ready not only to repulse the aggression, but to initiate the act of liberation itself, and to explode the Zionist presence in the Arab homeland. The Syrian Army, with its finger on the trigger, is united... I, as a military man, believe that the time has come to enter into a battle of annihilation."

=== Developments in Israel ===
Spurred by the virulent Arab rhetoric, mounting concern and pressure from the media, public bellicose statements by their military, the unexpected major battle over Syria in April, the consequences thereof for the Egyptian-Syrian defense agreement, the expulsion of UNEF, and the mobilization of Egyptian troops into Sinai, the Israeli public sense was of heightened fear and of an approaching holocaust.

Yitzhak Rabin reported that the cabinet was deadlocked over the issue of the blockade. Interior Minister Haim-Moshe Shapira in particular had pointed out that the Straits had been closed from 1951 to 1956 without the situation endangering Israel's security.

Nonetheless, on May 22 General Rabin reported to Israel's cabinet that the Egyptian forces were in a defensive posture, that they were not being deployed to attack. The IDF concluded that Nasser meant to intervene in case of an Israeli attack against Syria. On 23 May, Rabin realized that by blocking the Tiran straits, Nasser probably understood that he was going to war.

The Israeli cabinet met on May 23 and decided to launch an attack if the Straits of Tiran were not re-opened by May 25. Following an approach from United States Under Secretary of State for Political Affairs Eugene Rostow to allow time for the negotiation of a nonviolent solution, Israel agreed to a delay of ten days to two weeks.

On May 24 Prime Minister Eshkol told his generals: "Nobody ever said we were an army for preventive war ... I do not accept the mere fact that the Egyptian army is deployed in Sinai makes war inevitable. ... You did not receive all these weapons in order for you to say that now we are ready and well-equipped to destroy the Egyptian army, so we must do it".

U. S. intelligence likewise did not expect Egypt to attack in the absence of an Israeli invasion of Syria. On May 26 the United States communicated that assessment to Israel.

On 30 May Jordan joined Egypt and Israel felt threatened also by the opening of Jordan to Iraqi and other Arab troops and an Israeli preemptive attack became more likely.

While the generals were more troubled by the tanks and fighter airplanes that Nasser kept pouring into Sinai, the Israeli government were preoccupied with the Tiran Straits closure. Within Israel's political leadership, it was decided that if the US would not act, and if the UN could not act, then Israel would have to act. On 1 June, Moshe Dayan was made Israeli Defense Minister, and on June 3 the Johnson administration gave an ambiguous statement; Israel continued to prepare for war. Israel's attack against Egypt on June 5 began what would later be dubbed the Six-Day War.

== Who would win the war ==
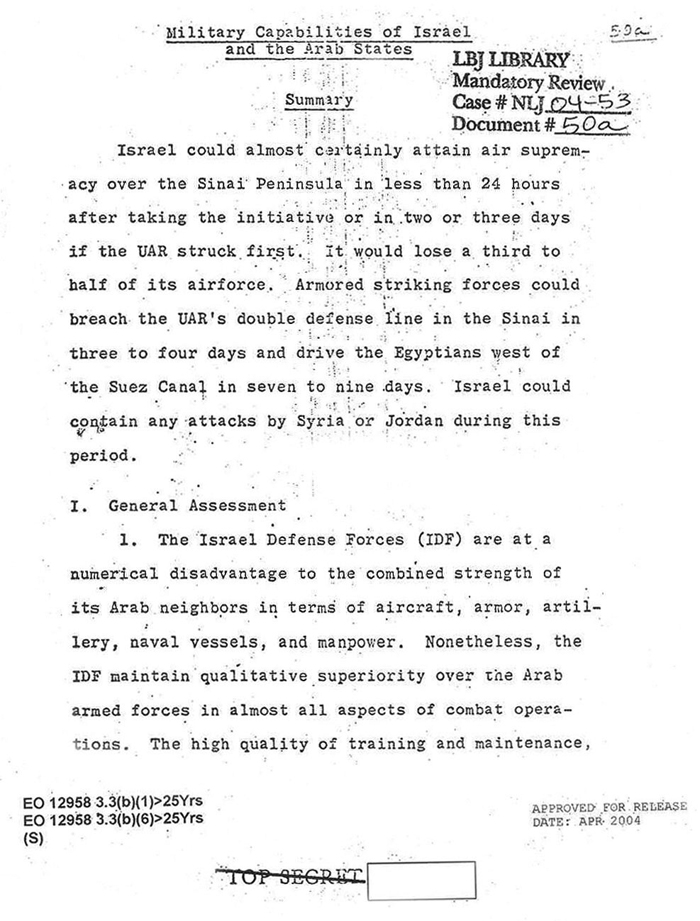
CIA Analysis of the 1967 Arab-Israeli War. The first page of the draft of the "special estimate" that predicted the outcome of the war

The Central Intelligence Agency assessed that Israel could "defend successfully against simultaneous Arab attacks on all fronts... or hold on any three fronts while mounting successfully a major offensive on the fourth."

Days before the war, the CIA assessed that Israel failed to take the instant military counteraction to Nasser's steps which might have been most effective. An attack would still be able to drive the Egyptians away from the entrance to the Strait of Tiran, but it would certainly cost Israel heavy losses of men and matériel, and doubted if Israel had sufficient war supply for a few weeks war.

The Soviet leadership considered the armed forces of Egypt, Syria, Algeria and Iraq as superior to the IDF in number of troops, tanks, planes, ships and amount of armaments. They had been equipped with the most modern weapons, and had received high-level training from the Soviets. They mistakenly estimated that Israel was militarily weak, and operated under the illusion that Arab armies could easily repel any Israeli attack and defeat the IDF on the battlefield.

== Retrospective ==
=== Israel: was the war imminent? ===
Israel viewed the Straits of Tiran as a vital interest, through which Israel received vital imports, mainly oil from Iran, and a blockade threatened Israel's ability to develop the Negev.

Former Chief of Staff of the armed forces Haim Bar-Lev (a deputy chief during the war) stated: "the entrance of the Egyptians into Sinai was not a casus belli," but argued instead that the Egyptian blockade of the Straits of Tiran ultimately caused the war.

After the closing of the Straits of Tiran, Israeli Foreign Minister Abba Eban contended that this was enough to start the war. Eban said, "From May the 24th onward, the question who started the war or who fired the first shot became momentously irrelevant. There is no difference in civil law between murdering a man by slow strangulation or killing him by a shot in the head... From the moment at which the blockade was posed, active hostilities had commenced, and Israel owed Egypt nothing of her Charter rights."

While not viewed by the Israeli military as an imminent threat, the presence of a long-term direct and 'immediate' threat on the border would require the IDF to mobilize its reserves and stand ready, thus severely disrupting normal life in Israel at intolerable economic cost.

Writing in 2002, American National Public Radio journalist Mike Shuster expressed a view that was prevalent in Israel before the war that the country "was surrounded by Arab states dedicated to its eradication. Egypt was ruled by Gamal Abdel Nasser, a firebrand nationalist whose army was the strongest in the Arab Middle East. Syria was governed by the radical Baathist Party, constantly issuing threats to push Israel into the sea." With what Israel saw as provocative acts by Nasser, including the blockade of the Straits and the mobilization of forces in the Sinai, creating military and economic pressure, and the United States temporizing because of its entanglement in the Vietnam War, Israel's political and military elite came to feel that preemption was not merely militarily preferable, but transformative.

Major General Mattityahu Peled, the Chief of Logistics for the Armed Forces during the war, said the survival argument was "a bluff which was born and developed only after the war ... When we spoke of the war in the General Staff, we talked of the political ramifications if we didn't go to war — what would happen to Israel in the next 25 years. Never of survival today." Peled also stated that "To pretend that the Egyptian forces massed on our frontiers were in a position to threaten the existence of Israel constitutes an insult not only to the intelligence of anyone capable of analyzing this sort of situation, but above all an insult to Zahal (Israeli military)."

In a 30 March 1968 Ma'ariv interview Defense Minister Moshe Dayan explained: "What do you mean, [the war was] unavoidable? It was, of course, possible to avoid the war if the Straits [of Tiran] had stayed closed to Israeli shipping."

Menachem Begin also stated that "The Egyptian army concentrations in the Sinai approaches did not prove that Nasser was really about to attack us. We must be honest with ourselves. We decided to attack him."

According to Martin van Creveld, the IDF pressed for war: "...the concept of 'defensible borders' was not even part of the IDFs own vocabulary. Anyone who will look for it in the military literature of the time will do so in vain. Instead, Israel's commanders based their thought on the 1948 war and, especially, their 1956 triumph over the Egyptians in which, from then Chief of Staff Dayan down, they had gained their spurs. When the 1967 crisis broke they felt certain of their ability to win a 'decisive, quick and elegant' victory, as one of their number, General Haim Bar Lev, put it, and pressed the government to start the war as soon as possible".

That the announcement of the blockade of the Straits of Tiran paved the way for war is disputed by Major General Indar Jit Rikhye, military adviser to the United Nations Secretary General, who called the accusation of a blockade "questionable," pointing out that an Israeli-flagged ship had not passed through the straits in two years, and that "The U.A.R. [Egyptian] navy had searched a couple of ships after the establishment of the blockade and thereafter relaxed its implementation."

=== Did Israel plan a war? ===
==== For ====
According to the U.S. assessment, Egypt had no intention of attacking Israel, and the Americans desperately tried to dissuade Israel from invading Egypt. The U.S. further views that Jordan and Syria only entered the war as a response to Israel's invasion of Egypt.

The USSR had come to similar conclusions: "... it is clear that the Soviet assessment from mid-May 1967 that Israel was about to strike at Syria was correct and well founded, and was not merely based on the public threats issued by Eshkol, Rabin and Yariv."

==== Against ====
Some of Israel's political leaders, however, hoped for a diplomatic solution. The U.S. president at the time, Lyndon Johnson, said that action by Egypt was the leading cause of the war:

If a single act of folly was more responsible for this explosion than any other, it was the arbitrary and dangerous announced decision that the Straits of Tiran would be closed. The right of innocent, maritime passage must be preserved for all nations.

According to Szabo, many commentators consider the war as the classic case of anticipatory attack in self-defense. According to Ferris, Nasser's decisions to ask for the removal of UNEF from Sinai and to block the Gulf of Aqaba to Israeli shipping, are commonly accepted as the point where war became inevitable.

=== Did Egypt plan a war? ===
==== For ====
According to Shlaim & Louis, in the end of May 1967, Nasser claimed in a public speech to have been aware of the Straits of Tiran closure implications: "Taking over Sharm El Sheikh meant confrontation with Israel. It also means that we ready to enter a general war with Israel. It was not a separate operation".

General Abdal Muhsin Murtaji, the commander of the Sinai front in 1967, wrote that the failed union with Syria and the debacle in Yemen forced Nasser to find an outlet for his failures, which he found through the 1967 war.

==== Against ====
Yitzhak Rabin, who served as the Chief of the General Staff for Israel during the war stated: "I do not believe that Nasser wanted war. The two divisions he sent into Sinai on May 14 would not have been enough to unleash an offensive against Israel. He knew it and we knew it."

Israeli Foreign Minister Abba Eban wrote in his autobiography that he found "Nasser's assurance that he did not plan an armed attack" convincing, adding that "Nasser did not want war; he wanted victory without war".

Some analysts suggest that Nasser took actions aimed at reaping political gains, which he knew carried a high risk of precipitating military hostilities. On this view, Nasser's willingness to take such risks was based on his fundamental underestimation of Israel's capacity for independent and effective military action.

== The war consequences ==
On June 1, Israel formed a National Unity Government, and on June 4 the decision was made to go to war. The next morning, Israel launched Operation Focus, a large-scale surprise air strike that was the opening of the Six-Day War.

Controversy remains as to whether Israel's attack was a preemptive strike or an unjustified attack. Many commentators consider the war as the classic case of anticipatory attack in self-defense.

Historian Michael Oren writes that Rusk was "mad as hell" and that Johnson later wrote "I have never concealed my regret that Israel decided to move when it did".

== See also ==
- 1949 Armistice Agreements
- Six-Day War
- Suez Crisis

== General and cited references ==
- al-Qusi, Abdallah Ahmad Hamid (1999). Al-Wisam fi at-Ta'rikh. Cairo: Al-Mu'asasa al-'Arabiya al-Haditha. No ISBN available.
- Aloni, Shlomo (2001). Arab-Israeli Air Wars 1947–1982. Osprey Aviation. ISBN 1-84176-294-6
- Alteras, Isaac (1993). Eisenhower and Israel: U.S.-Israeli Relations, 1953–1960, University Press of Florida. ISBN 0-8130-1205-8.
- Bailey, Sydney (1990). Four Arab-Israeli Wars and the Peace Process. London: The MacMillan Press. ISBN 0-312-04649-9.
- Bar-On, Mordechai; Morris, Benny & Golani, Motti (2002). Reassessing Israel's Road to Sinai/Suez, 1956: A "Trialogue". In Gary A. Olson (Ed.). Traditions and Transitions in Israel Studies: Books on Israel, Volume VI (pp. 3–42). SUNY Press. ISBN 0-7914-5585-8
- Bar-On, Mordechai (2006). Never-Ending Conflict: Israeli Military History, ISBN 0-275-98158-4
- Bard, Mitchell G. (2002, 2008). The Complete Idiot's Guide to Middle East Conflict. NY: Alpha books. ISBN 0-02-864410-7. 4th Edition ISBN 1-59257-791-1. Chapter 14, "Six Days to Victory" is reproduced online as The 1967 Six-Day War. at the Jewish Virtual Library of the American-Israeli Cooperative Enterprise.
- Ben-Gurion, David (1999). Ben-gurion diary: May–June 1967. Israel Studies 4(2), 199–220.
- Black, Ian (1992). Israel's Secret Wars: A History of Israel's Intelligence Services. Grove Press. ISBN 0-8021-3286-3
- Bober, Arie (ed.) (1972). The other Israel. Doubleday Anchor. ISBN 0-385-01467-8.
- Boczek, Boleslaw Adam (2005). International Law: A Dictionary. Scarecrow Press. ISBN 0-8108-5078-8
- Borowiec, Andrew (1998). Modern Tunisia: A Democratic Apprenticeship. Greenwood Publishing Group. ISBN 0-275-96136-2.
- Bowen, Jeremy (2003). Six Days: How the 1967 War Shaped the Middle East. London: Simon & Schuster. ISBN 0-7432-3095-7
- Brams, Steven J. & Jeffrey M. Togman (1998). Camp David: Was the agreement fair? In Paul F. Diehl (Ed.), A Road Map to War: Territorial Dimensions of International Conflict. Nashville: Vanderbilt University Press. ISBN 0-8265-1329-8.
- Brecher, Michael (1996). Eban and Israeli foreign policy: Diplomacy, war and disengagement. In A Restless Mind: Essays in Honor of Amos Perlmutter, Benjamin Frankel (ed.), pp. 104–117. Routledge. ISBN 0-7146-4607-5
- Bregman, Ahron (2000). Israel's Wars, 1947–1993. Routledge. ISBN 0-415-21468-8.
- Bregman, Ahron (2002). Israel's Wars: A History Since 1947. London: Routledge. ISBN 0-415-28716-2
- Burrowes, Robert & Muzzio, Douglas (1972). The Road to the Six Day War: Towards an Enumerative History of Four Arab States and Israel, 1965–67. The Journal of Conflict Resolution, Vol. 16, No. 2, Research Perspectives on the Arab-Israeli Conflict: A Symposium, pp. 211–226.
- Cohen, Raymond (1988). "Intercultural Communication between Israel and Egypt: Deterrence Failure before the Six-Day war". Review of International Studies. 14 (1): 1–16.
- Christie, Hazel (1999). Law of the Sea. Manchester: Manchester University Press. ISBN 0-7190-4382-4
- Churchill, Randolph & Churchill, Winston (1967). The Six Day War. Houghton Mifflin Company. ISBN 0-395-07532-7
- Colaresi, Michael P. (2005). Scare Tactics: The politics of international rivalry. Syracuse University Press. ISBN 9780815630661
- Eban, Abba (1977). Abba Eban: An Autobiography. Random House. ISBN 0-394-49302-8
- Ehteshami, Anoushiravan and Hinnebusch, Raymond A. (1997). Syria & Iran: Middle Powers in a Penetrated Regional System. London: Routledge. ISBN 0-415-15675-0
- Feron, James (1967, 13 May). Israelis ponder blow at Syrians; Some leaders decide that force is the only way to curtail terrorism. The New York Times (Fee required).
- El-Gamasy, Mohamed Abdel Ghani. (1993). The October War. The American University in Cairo Press. ISBN 977-424-316-1.
- Gawrych, George W. (2000). The Albatross of Decisive Victory: War and Policy Between Egypt and Israel in the 1967 and 1973 Arab-Israeli Wars. Greenwood Press. ISBN 0-313-31302-4. Available in multiple PDF files from the Combat Studies Institute and the Combined Arms Research Library, CSI Publications in parts Archived 2010-12-02 at the Wayback Machine.
- Gelpi, Christopher (2002). Power of Legitimacy: Assessing the Role of Norms in Crisis Bargaining. Princeton University Press. ISBN 0-691-09248-6
- Gerner, Deborah J. (1994). One Land, Two Peoples. Westview Press. ISBN 0-8133-2180-8, p. 112
- Gerteiny, Alfred G. & Ziegler, Jean (2007). The Terrorist Conjunction: The United States, the Israeli-Palestinian Conflict, and Al-Qā'ida. Greenwood Publishing Group. ISBN 0-275-99643-3, p. 142
- Gilbert, Martin (2008). Israel – A History. McNally & Loftin Publishers. ISBN 0-688-12363-5. Chapter available online: Chapter 21: Nasser's Challenge.
- Goldstein, Erik (1992). Wars and Peace Treaties, 1816–1991. Routledge. ISBN 0-415-07822-9
- Green, Stephen J. (1984). Taking Sides: America's Secret Relations With Militant Israel. William Morrow & Co. ISBN 0-688-02643-5.
- Griffin, David J. (2006). Hawker Hunter 1951 to 2007 Lulu.com, 4 edition. ISBN 1-4303-0593-2.
- Haddad, Yvonne (1992). Islamists and the "Problem of Israel": The 1967 Awakening. Middle East Journal, Vol. 46, No. 2, pp. 266–285.
- Hajjar, Sami G. (February 1999). The Israel-Syria Track, Middle East Policy, Volume VI,, Number 3. Retrieved 30 September 2006.
- Hammel, Eric (1992). Six Days in June: How Israel Won the 1967 Arab-Israeli War. Simon & Schuster. ISBN 0-7434-7535-6
- Hattendorf, John B. (2000). Naval Strategy and Power in the Mediterranean: Past, Present and Future. Taylor & Francis. ISBN 978-0-7146-8054-5.
- Handel, Michael I. (1973). Israel's political-military doctrine. Center for International Affairs, Harvard University. ISBN 0-87674-025-5
- Hart, Alan (1989). Arafat: A political biography. Indiana University Press ISBN 0-253-32711-3.
- Herzog, Chaim (1982). The Arab-Israeli Wars. Arms & Armour Press. ISBN 0-85368-367-0
- Herbert, Nicholas (17 May 1967). Egyptian Forces On Full Alert: Ready to fight for Syria. The Times, p. 1; Issue 56943; col E.
- Herzog, Chaim (1989). Heroes of Israel: Profiles of Jewish Courage. Little Brown and Company. ISBN 0-316-35901-7.
- Higham, Robin. (2003). 100 Years of Air Power and Aviation. TAMU Press. ISBN 1-58544-241-0.
- Hinnebusch, Raymond A. (2003). The international politics of the Middle East. Manchester University Press. ISBN 978-0-7190-5346-7
- Israel Ministry of Foreign Affairs (2004). Background on Israeli POWs and MIAs.
- Israel Ministry of Foreign Affairs (2008). The Six-Day War (June 1967).
- "Israel Reportedly Killed POWs in '67 War; Historians Say Deaths of Hundreds of Egyptians Was Covered Up Israel Reportedly Killed POWs in '67 War; Historians Say Deaths of Hundreds of Egyptians Was Covered Up", The Washington Post, 17 August 1995, p. A.30 (Fee required).
- James, Laura (2005). The Nassar And His Enemies: Foreign Policy Decision Making In Egypt On The Eve Of The Six Day War. The Middle East Review of International Affairs. Volume 9, No. 2, Article 2.
- "Israelis Say Tape Shows Nasser Fabricated 'Plot'; Recording Said to Be of Phone Call to Hussein Gives Plan to Accuse U.S. and Britain" (PDF). The New York Times. 1967-06-09. p. 17.
- Jia, Bing Bing (1998). The Regime of Straits in International Law (Oxford Monographs in International Law). Oxford University Press, USA. ISBN 0-19-826556-5.
- Koboril, Iwao and Glantz, Michael H. (1998). Central Eurasian Water Crisis. United Nations University Press. ISBN 92-808-0925-3
- Krauthammer, Charles (2007-05-18). "Prelude to the Six Days". The Washington Post. pp. A23. ISSN 0740-5421.
- Lavoy, Peter R.; Sagan, Scott Douglas & Wirtz, James J. (eds.) (2000). Planning the Unthinkable: How New Powers Will Use Nuclear, Biological, and Chemical Weapons. Cornell University Press. ISBN 0-8014-8704-8.
- Leibler, Isi (1972). The Case For Israel. Australia: The Executive Council of Australian Jewry. ISBN 0-9598984-0-9.
- Lenczowski, George (1990). American Presidents and the Middle East. Duke University Press. ISBN 0-8223-0972-6.
- Lyndon Baines Johnson Library (1994). Transcript, Robert S. McNamara Oral History, Special Interview I, 3/26/93, by Robert Dallek, Internet Copy, LBJ Library. Retrieved 20 July 2010.
- McNamara: US Near War in '67. (1983, 16 Sep.). The Boston Globe. p. 1. (subscription required).
- Mansour, Camille (1994). Beyond Alliance: Israel and US Foreign Policy. Columbia University Press. ISBN 0-231-08492-7.
- Maoz, Zeev (2009). Defending the Holy Land: A Critical Analysis of Israel's Security & Foreign Policy. The University of Michigan Press. ISBN 978-0-472-03341-6
- Morris, Benny (2001). Righteous Victims New York, Vintage Books. ISBN 978-0-679-74475-7
- Miller, Benjamin (2007). States, Nations, and the Great Powers: The Sources of Regional War and Peace. Cambridge University Press. ISBN 0-521-69161-3
- Murakami, Masahiro (1995). Managing Water for Peace in the Middle East: Alternative Strategies Archived 2010-06-29 at the Wayback Machine. United Nations University Press. ISBN 92-808-0858-3.
- Mutawi, Samir (2002). Jordan in the 1967 War. Cambridge: Cambridge University Press. ISBN 0-521-52858-5
- Nordeen, Lon & Nicole, David.. (1996). Phoenix over the Nile: A history of Egyptian Air Power 1932–1994. Washington DC: Smithsonian Institution. ISBN 1-56098-626-3.
- "Mediterranean Eskadra". Federation of American Scientists (2000).
- Oren, Michael (2002). Six Days of War. Oxford University Press. ISBN 0-19-515174-7
- Oren, Michael (2005). The Revelations of 1967: New Research on the Six Day War and Its Lessons for the Contemporary Middle East, Israel studies, volume 10, number 2. (Subscription required).
- Oren, Michael (2006). "The Six-Day War", in Bar-On, Mordechai (ed.), Never-Ending Conflict: Israeli Military History. Greenwood Publishing Group. ISBN 0-275-98158-4.
- Parker, Richard B. (1996). The Six-day War: A Retrospective. University Press of Florida. ISBN 0-8130-1383-6.
- Parker, Richard B. (August 1997). "USAF in the Sinai in the 1967 War: Fact or Fiction" (PDF). Journal of Palestine Studies. XXVII (1): 67–75. doi:10.1525/jps.1997.27.1.00p0164l. Archived from the original (PDF) on 2017-10-10.
- Phythian, Mark (2001). The Politics of British Arms Sales Since 1964. Manchester: Manchester University Press. ISBN 0-7190-5907-0
- Podeh, Elie (Winter 2004). "The Lie That Won't Die: Collusion, 1967". Middle East Quarterly. 11 (1).
- Pimlott, John (1983). Middle East Conflicts: From 1945 to the Present. Orbis. ISBN 0-85613-547-X.
- Pollack, Kenneth (2004). Arabs at War: Military Effectiveness, 1948–1991. University of Nebraska Press. ISBN 0-8032-8783-6
- Pollack, Kenneth (2005). Air Power in the Six-Day War. The Journal of Strategic Studies. 28(3), 471-503.
- Prior, Michael (1999). Zionism and the State of Israel: A Moral Inquiry. London: Routledge. ISBN 0-415-20462-3
- Quandt, William B. (2005). Peace Process: American Diplomacy and the Arab-Israeli Conflict Since 1967. Brookings Institution Press and the University of California Press; 3 edition. ISBN 0-520-24631-4
- Quigley, John B. (2005). Case for Palestine: An International Law Perspective. Duke University Press. ISBN 0-8223-3539-5
- Quigley, John B. (1990). Palestine and Israel: A Challenge to Justice. Duke University Press. ISBN 0-8223-1023-6
- Rabil, Robert G. (2003). Embattled Neighbors: Syria, Israel, and Lebanon. Lynne Rienner Publishers. ISBN 1-58826-149-2
- Rabin, Yitzhak (1996). The Rabin Memoirs. University of California Press. ISBN 0-520-20766-1.
- Rauschning, Dietrich; Wiesbrock, Katja & Lailach, Martin (eds.) (1997). Key Resolutions of the United Nations General Assembly 1946-1996. Cambridge University Press. ISBN 0-521-59704-8.
- Rikhye, Indar Jit (1980). The Sinai Blunder. London: Routledge. ISBN 0-7146-3136-1
- Robarge, David S. (2007). Getting It Right: CIA Analysis of the 1967 Arab-Israeli War, Center for the Study of Intelligence, Vol. 49 No. 1
- Rubenberg, Cheryl A. (1989). Israel and the American National Interest. University of Illinois Press. ISBN 0-252-06074-1
- Sachar, Howard M. (1976, 2007) A History of Israel from the Rise of Zionism to Our Time. New York: Alfred A. Knopf. ISBN 0-394-48564-5; ISBN 0-375-71132-5.
- Sadeh, Eligar (1997). Militarization and State Power in the Arab-Israeli Conflict: Case Study of Israel, 1948–1982. Universal Publishers. ISBN 0-9658564-6-1
- Sandler, Deborah; Aldy, Emad & Al-Khoshman Mahmoud A. (1993). Protecting the Gulf of Aqaba. – A regional environmental challenge. Environmental Law Institute. 0911937463.
- Seale, Patrick (1988). Asad: The Struggle for Peace in the Middle East. University of California Press. ISBN 0-520-06976-5
- Segev, Samuel (1967). A Red Sheet: the Six Day War.
- Segev, Tom (2005). Israel in 1967. Keter. ISBN 978-965-07-1370-6.
- Segev, Tom (2007). 1967: Israel, the War, and the Year that Transformed the Middle East Metropolitan Books. ISBN 978-0-8050-7057-6
- Sela, Avraham (1997). The Decline of the Arab-Israeli Conflict: Middle East Politics and the Quest for Regional Order. SUNY Press. ISBN 0-7914-3537-7
- Shafqat, Saeed (2004). Islamic world and South Asia: Rise of Islamism and Terror, Causes and Consequences?. In Kaniz F. Yusuf (Ed.) Unipolar World & The Muslim States. Islamabad: Pakistan Forum, pp 217–246.
- Shemesh, Moshe (2008). Arab Politics, Palestinian Nationalism and the Six Day War. Sussex Academic Press. ISBN 1-84519-188-9.
- Shlaim, Avi (2000). The Iron Wall: Israel and the Arab World. W. W. Norton & Company. ISBN 978-0-393-32112-8.
- Shlaim, Avi (2007). Lion of Jordan: The Life of King Hussein in War and Peace Vintage Books ISBN 978-1-4000-7828-8
- Shlaim, Avi; Louis, William Roger (13 February 2012), The 1967 Arab-Israeli War: Origins and Consequences, Cambridge University Press, ISBN 978-1-107-00236-4
- Smith, Hedrick (1967-06-14). "As the Shock Wears Off; Arab World, Appraising Its Defeat, is Split as it Gropes for Strategy" (PDF). The New York Times. p. 16.
- Smith, Hedrick (1967-09-15). "Envoys Say Nasser Now Concedes U.S. Didn't Help Israel". The New York Times. p. 1, col. 5; p. 3, col. 1.
- Stein, Janice Gross (1991). The Arab-Israeli War of 1967: Inadvertent War Through Miscalculated Escalation, in Avoiding War: Problems of Crisis Management, Alexander L. George, ed. Boulder: Westview Press.
- Stephens, Robert H. (1971). Nasser: A Political Biography. London: Allen Lane/The Penguin Press. ISBN 0-7139-0181-0
- Stone, David (2004). Wars of the Cold War. Brassey's. ISBN 1-85753-342-9
- Tolan, Sandy (June 4, 2007). "Rethinking Israel's David-and-Goliath past". Salon. Archived from the original on June 8, 2012.
- Tucker, Spencer (2004). Tanks: An Illustrated History of Their Impact. ABC-CLIO. ISBN 1-57607-995-3
- United Nations (5 June 1967). 1347 Security Council MEETING : 5 June 1967. Provisional agenda (S/PV.1347/Rev.1). On a subpage of the website of The United Nations Information System on the Question of Palestine (UNISPAL).
- van Creveld, Martin (2004). Defending Israel: A Controversial Plan Toward Peace. Thomas Dunne Books. ISBN 0-312-32866-4
- Youngs, Tim. (2001). Developments in the Middle East Peace Process 1991–2000 London: International Affairs and Defence Section, House of Commons Library. ISSN 1368-8456.
- Finkelstein, Norman (2003). Image and reality of the Israel-Palestine conflict. Verso. ISBN 978-1-85984-442-7.
