= Controversies related to the Six-Day War =

The Six-Day War was fought between June 5 and June 10, 1967, by Israel and the neighboring states of Egypt, known then as the United Arab Republic (UAR), Jordan, and Syria. The conflict began with a large-scale surprise air strike by Israel on Egypt and ended with a major victory by Israel. A number of controversies have arisen out of the causes and conduct of the war, namely: whether Israel's action was a preemptive strike justified by the threat of an imminent attack by the Arab states or an unjustified and unprovoked attack; whether the Egyptians killed stragglers from their own forces as they returned from the defeat; whether the Israelis killed unarmed Egyptian prisoners; and the extent of foreign support given to the combatants in the war.

== Preemptive strike versus unjustified attack ==
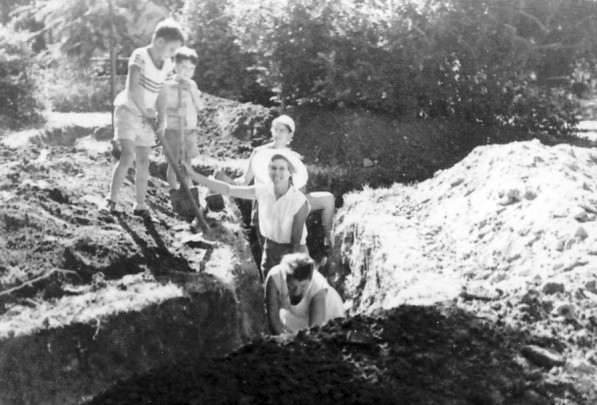
Israeli women and children dig trenches at Gan Shmuel. The photo was taken during the waiting period in the days preceding the Six-Day War.

Initially, both Egypt and Israel announced that they had been attacked by the other country. Gideon Rafael, the Israeli Ambassador to the UN, received a message from the Israeli foreign office: "inform immediately the President of the Sec. Co. that Israel is now engaged in repelling Egyptian land and air forces." At 3:10 am, Rafael woke ambassador Hans Tabor, the Danish President of the Security Council for June, with the news that Egyptian forces had "moved against Israel". and that Israel was responding to a "cowardly and treacherous" attack from Egypt..." At the Security Council meeting of June 5, both Israel and Egypt claimed to be repelling an invasion by the other, and "Israeli officials – Eban and Evron – swore that Egypt had fired first". On June 5 Egypt, supported by the USSR, charged Israel with aggression. Israel claimed that Egypt had struck first, telling the council that "in the early hours of this morning Egyptian armoured columns moved in an offensive thrust against Israel's borders. At the same time Egyptian planes took off from airfields in Sinai and struck out towards Israel. Egyptian artillery in the Gaza strip shelled the Israel villages of Kissufim, Nahal-Oz and Ein Hashelosha..." In fact, this was not the case, and the US Office of Current Intelligence "...soon concluded that the Israelis – contrary to their claims – had fired first." It is now known as the war started by a surprise Israeli attack against Egypt's air forces that left its ground troops vulnerable to further Israeli air strikes.

Though Israel had struck first, Israel initially claimed that it was attacked first. Later it claimed that its attack was a preemptive strike in the face of a planned invasion. Israel justifies its preemptive action with a review of the context of its position: Economic strangulation through the shipping blockade in the Straits of Tiran (90% of Israeli oil passed through the Straits of Tiran), the imminence of war on three fronts (hundreds of thousands of enemy troops and hundreds of tanks massed on its borders), and possible social and economic difficulty of maintaining a civilian army draft indefinitely. According to Israeli historian, politician and former Israeli ambassador to the United States, Michael Oren, the Arabs, "had planned the conquest of Israel and the expulsion or murder of much of its Jewish inhabitants in 1967", adding that claims of "revisionist historians" that the neighboring Arab countries had not had aggressive intentions toward Israel, and that Israel sought to expand its borders, have been refuted by documentary evidence. He adds that, given the persistent threat of an Egyptian and general Arab attack at the time, "[p]re-emption was the only option." Israel's attack is often cited as an example of a preemptive attack and according to a journal published by the US State Department it is "perhaps the most cited example". According to Yoram Dinstein, Israel's actions were an act of "interceptive self-defense." According to this view, though no single Egyptian step may have qualified as an armed attack, Egypt's collective actions that included the closure of the Straits of Tiran, the expulsion of UN peacekeepers, the massive armed deployment along Israel's borders and her constant saber rattling, made clear that Egypt was bent on armed attack against Israel. In 2002 radio broadcast NPR correspondent Mike Shuster stated that "[t]he prevailing view among historians is that although Israel struck first, the Israeli strike was defensive in nature."

Oren has acknowledged that both US and Israeli intelligence indicated that troop movements in Egypt, taken by themselves, had only defensive, not offensive, purposes. However, he notes that the deployed Egyptian troops in the Sinai would move against Israel in the event that Israel undertook an invasion of Syria toward Damascus in response to repeated provocations by Syrian materiel and raids by fedayeen operating in Syrian territory. This fact was mentioned by Israeli PM Menachem Begin, who, in order to argue for an Israeli invasion of Lebanon in the 1980s, reminded the Israeli Knesset that preemptive strikes were already part of Israel's history and that waiting for her enemies to choose the time of coordinated warfare is a losing policy, remarking in regards to the 1967 war that, "The Egyptian army concentrations in the Sinai approaches do not prove that Nasser was really about to attack us. (...) We decided to attack him". But, he added in that speech, the 1967 war was not an act of aggression, but of response to multiple acts of aggression designed to debilitate Israel step by step as a preliminary to outright war.

The Arab view was that it was an unjustified attack. M. A. El Kony, Permanent Representative of the United Arab Republic (Egypt), remarked at a UN session that "Israel has committed a treacherous premeditated aggression against the United Arab Republic...While we in the United Arab Republic...have declared our intention not to initiate any offensive action and have fully co-operated in the attempts that were made to relieve the tension in the area". After the war, Israeli officials admitted that Israel wasn't expecting to be attacked when it initiated hostilities against Egypt. Mordechai Bentov, an Israeli cabinet minister who attended the June 4th Cabinet meeting, called into question the idea that there was a "danger of extermination" saying that it was "invented of whole cloth and exaggerated after the fact to justify the annexation of new Arab territories." Israel received reports from the United States to the effect that Egyptian deployments were defensive and anticipatory of a possible Israeli attack, and the US assessed that if anything, it was Israel that was pressing to begin hostilities. Abba Eban, Israel's foreign minister during the war, later wrote in his autobiography that Nasser's assurances he wasn't planning to attack Israel were credible: "Nasser did not want war. He wanted victory without war." Israeli military historian Martin van Creveld has written that while the exact origins of the war may never be known, Israel's forces were "spoiling for a fight and willing to go to considerable lengths to provoke one". According to James Thuo Gathii, Israel's case did not meet the Caroline test for anticipatory self-defence, but it was the closest attack ever to the Caroline test.

However, Israel also maintains that its attacks were justified by the Egyptian closure of the Straits of Tiran, an international waterway, the closure of which constituted a casus belli under customary international law later codified in 1958 Geneva Conventions on the Law of the Sea. However, since the UAR and its Arab allies were not signatories to the 1958 Geneva Conventions, they argued that since the Gulf of Aqaba was not a waterway connecting two regions of open sea, it was not technically a strait, and therefore that it was not covered by the 1949 ICJ decision ruling that a country is required to allow passage through a strait. However, the United States and the Western European nations agreed with the Israeli interpretation that Israeli vessels had a right of passage through the Straits of Tiran. On the other hand, Egypt's position was supported by much of the third world.

== Allegations of Egyptian atrocities against fellow Egyptians ==
Following the war little remained of Egypt's seven divisions deployed in Sinai. Thousands of Egyptian soldiers became stragglers and tried desperately to make their way westward toward the Suez Canal zone. Israel did not have the capacity to take them all prisoner and where possible, facilitated their movement toward the Canal where they would attempt to swim across. "However, one group (of Egyptian stragglers), as they were in mid-stream, were mown down by their own forces on the far side of the Canal with machine-guns." It has been suggested that Nasser did not want Egypt to learn of the true extent of his defeat and thus ordered the killing of survivors who tried to escape. Other Egyptian survivors were transferred to Egypt at Qantara and once on the Egyptian side of the Canal, were herded into compounds where they were surrounded by barbed wire. Winston Churchill, the grandson of the famed former British Prime Minister, notes that Egyptian soldiers who succeeded in making their way back to Egypt, never made it home and instead were kept in cantonments, "to prevent the spread of despondency among the civil population."

== Allegations that the IDF killed Egyptian prisoners ==
After the war, a national debate ensued in Israel regarding allegations that soldiers killed unarmed Egyptians. A few soldiers said that they had witnessed the execution of unarmed prisoners. Gabby Bron, a journalist for Yedioth Ahronoth, said he had witnessed the execution of about ten Egyptian prisoners. Michael Bar-Zohar said that he had witnessed the murder of three Egyptian POWs by a cook, and Meir Pa'il said that he knew of many instances in which soldiers had killed POWs or Arab civilians. Uri Milstein, an Israeli military historian, was reported as claiming that there were many incidents in the 1967 war in which Egyptian soldiers were killed by Israeli troops after they had raised their hands in surrender. "It was not an official policy, but there was an atmosphere that it was okay to do it," Milstein said. "Some commanders decided to do it; others refused. But everyone knew about it." Allegations that Egyptian soldiers fleeing into the desert were shot were confirmed in reports written after the war. Israeli historian and journalist Tom Segev, in his book "1967", quotes one soldier who wrote, "Our soldiers were sent to scout out groups of men fleeing and shoot them. That was the order, and it was done while they were really trying to escape. If they were armed, they got shot. There was no other option. You couldn't even really take prisoners. And sometimes you had to finish people off when they were lying on the ground with their heads on their hands. Simply shoot them."

According to a September 21, 1995 report in The New York Times, the Egyptian government announced that it had discovered two shallow mass graves in the Sinai at El Arish containing the remains of 30 to 60 Egyptian prisoners allegedly shot by Israeli soldiers during the 1967 war. Israel responded by sending Eli Dayan, a Deputy Foreign Minister, to Egypt to discuss the matter. During his visit, Dayan offered compensation to the families of victims, but explained that Israel was unable to pursue those responsible owing to its 20-year statute of limitations. The Israeli Ambassador to Cairo, David Sultan, asked to be relieved of his post after the Egyptian daily Al Shaab said he was personally responsible for the killing of 100 Egyptian prisoners, although both the Israeli Embassy and Foreign Ministry denied the charge and said that it was not even clear that Sultan had served in the military.

Capt. Milovan Zorc and Miobor Stosic, a military liaison official, who were members of the Yugoslav Reconnaissance Battalion that formed part of the 3,400-strong UNEF deployed as a buffer between Egypt and Israel and witnessed the war, have cast doubt on claims that Israel executed Egyptian prisoners of war in the area where they were stationed. They said that if an Israeli unit had killed some 250 POWs near the Egyptian town of el-Arish, they would likely have come to know about it.

Declassified IDF documents show that on June 11, 1967, the operations branch of the general staff felt it necessary to issue new orders concerning the treatment of prisoners. The order read that because existing orders were contradictory:

1. Soldiers and civilians who conceded were not to be hurt by any means.
2. Soldiers and civilians who possessed a weapon and failed to surrender would be killed. However, soldiers caught disobeying the order by killing prisoners would be severely punished.

According to Israeli sources, 4,338 Egyptian soldiers were taken captive by IDF. Eleven Israeli soldiers were taken captive by Egyptian forces. POW exchanges were completed on January 23, 1968.

== Combat support ==
According to George Lenczowski, as early as May 23, President Johnson secretly authorized supplying Israel by air with a variety of arms systems, even when an embargo on weapons shipments was placed on the Middle East.

Stephen Green wrote in his book that the United States sent reconnaissance aircraft to track nighttime movement of Egyptian ground forces in order to facilitate daytime Israeli air attacks that proved important for Israel's advances. Richard Parker disputes this and suggests that it is a hoax, based on the questionable testimony of a single man.

On the second day of the war, Arab state-run media reported that American and British troops were fighting on Israel's side. Radio Cairo and the government newspaper Al-Ahram made a number of claims, among them: that U.S. and British carrier-based aircraft flew sorties against the Egyptians; that U.S. aircraft based in Wheelus Air Base-Libya attacked Egypt; and that American spy satellites provided imagery to Israel. Mohamed Hassanein Heikal, the chief of "Al-Ahram" in the Nasserite period, repeated similar claims at Al Jazeera channel. Later, Muammar al-Gaddafi's Libyan government confirmed these claims also only to get a pretext for the coup that took place on 1 September 1969. The governments of the United States and Britain officially denied involvement. Similar reports were aired by Radio Damascus and Radio Amman. Egyptian media even said that King Hussein had personally seen radar observations showing British aircraft taking off from aircraft carriers.

Outside of the Arab world, claims of American and British military intervention were not taken seriously. Britain, the U.S. and Israel denied these allegations. On June 8, Egyptian credibility was further damaged when Israel released an audio recording to the press, which they said was a radio-telephone conversation intercepted two days earlier between Nasser and King Hussein of Jordan.

Nasser: ...Shall we include also the United States? Do you know of this, shall we announce that the U.S. is cooperating with Israel?

Hussein: Hello. I do not hear, the connection is the worst – the line between you and the palace of the King from which the King is speaking is bad.
Nasser: Hello, will we say the U.S. and England or just the U.S.?
Hussein: The U.S. and England.
Nasser: Does Britain have aircraft carriers?
Hussein: (Answer unintelligible).
Nasser: Good. King Hussein will make an announcement and I will make an announcement. Thank you... Will his Majesty make an announcement on the participation of Americans and the British?
Hussein: (Answer unintelligible).

Nasser: By God, I say that I will make an announcement and you will make an announcement and we will see to it that the Syrians will make an announcement that American and British airplanes are taking part against us from aircraft carriers. We will issue an announcement, we will stress the matter and we will drive the point home.

In the immediate aftermath of the war, as the extent of the Arab military defeat became apparent, Arab leaders differed on whether to continue to assert that the American military had assisted the Israeli victory. On June 9, 1967, Nasser stated in his resignation speech (his resignation was not accepted):

What is now established is that American and British aircraft carriers were off the shores of the enemy helping his war effort. Also, British aircraft raided, in broad daylight, positions of the Syrian and Egyptian fronts, in addition to operations by a number of American aircraft reconnoitering some of our positions... Indeed, it can be said without exaggeration that the enemy was operating with an air force three times stronger than his normal force.

King Hussein, however, later denied the allegations of American military support. On June 30, he announced in New York that he was "perfectly satisfied" that "no American planes took part, or any British planes either". In September, The New York Times reported that Nasser had privately assured Arab leaders, gathered in Sudan to discuss the Khartoum Resolution, that his earlier claims were false.

Nonetheless, these allegations, that the Arabs were fighting the Americans and British rather than Israel alone, took hold in the Arab world. As reported by the British Representative in Jeddah, Saudi Arabia, a country at odds with Egypt as a result of the Yemen war:

President Abdel Nasser's allegation ... is firmly believed by almost the whole Arab population here who listen to the radio or read the press ... Our broadcast denials are little heard and just not believed. The denials we have issued to the broadcasting service and press have not been published. Even highly educated persons basically friendly to us seem convinced that the allegations are true. Senior foreign ministry officials who received my formal written and oral denials profess to believe them but nevertheless appear skeptical. I consider that this allegation has seriously damaged our reputation in the Arab world more than anything else and has caused a wave of suspicion or feeling against us which will persist in some underlying form for the foreseeable future ... Further denials or attempts at local publicity by us will not dispel this belief and may now only exacerbate local feeling since the Arabs are understandably sensitive to their defeat with a sense of humiliation and resent self-justification by us who in their eyes helped their enemy to bring this about.

Well after the end of the war, the Egyptian government and its newspapers continued to make claims of collusion between Israel, the United Kingdom and the United States. These included a series of weekly articles in Al-Ahram, simultaneously broadcast on Radio Cairo by Mohamed Heikal. Heikal attempted to uncover the "secrets" of the war. He presented a blend of facts, documents, and interpretations. Heikal's conclusion was clear-cut: there was a secret U.S.-Israeli collusion against Syria and Egypt.

According to Israeli historian Elie Podeh: "All post-1967 [Egyptian] history textbooks repeated the claim that Israel launched the war with the support of Britain and the United States. The narrative also established a direct link between the 1967 war and former imperialist attempts to control the Arab world, thus portraying Israel as an imperialist stooge. The repetition of this fabricated story, with only minor variations, in all history school textbooks means that all Egyptian schoolchildren have been exposed to, and indoctrinated with, the collusion story." The following example comes from the textbook Al-Wisam fi at-Ta'rikh:

The United States' role: Israel was not (fighting) on its own in the (1967) war. Hundreds of volunteers, pilots, and military officers with American scientific spying equipment of the most advanced type photographed the Egyptian posts for it (Israel), jammed the Egyptian defense equipment, and transmitted to it the orders of the Egyptian command.

In Six Days of War, Michael Oren argues that the Arab leadership spread false claims about American involvement in order to secure Soviet support for the Arab side. After the war, as the extent of the Israeli victory became apparent to the Arab public, these claims helped deflect blame for the defeat away from Nasser and other Arab leaders. In reaction to these claims, Arab oil-producing countries announced either an oil embargo on the United States and Britain or suspended oil exports altogether.

Six Arab countries broke off diplomatic relations with the United States, and Lebanon withdrew its Ambassador. More broadly, the Six Day War hastened the process of anti-American radicalization in the Middle East, a process expressed by the growth of both leftist and religious-fundamentalist movements and their increased resort to terrorism as a weapon in their anti-American struggle. In fact, it transcended the Arab countries and spread to Iran, Pakistan and the Third World, whose delegates at the UN began adopting increasingly critical posture toward America.

A British guidance telegram to Middle East posts concluded: "The Arabs' reluctance to disbelieve all versions of the big lie springs in part from a need to believe that the Israelis could not have defeated them so thoroughly without outside assistance."

== Non-combat support ==
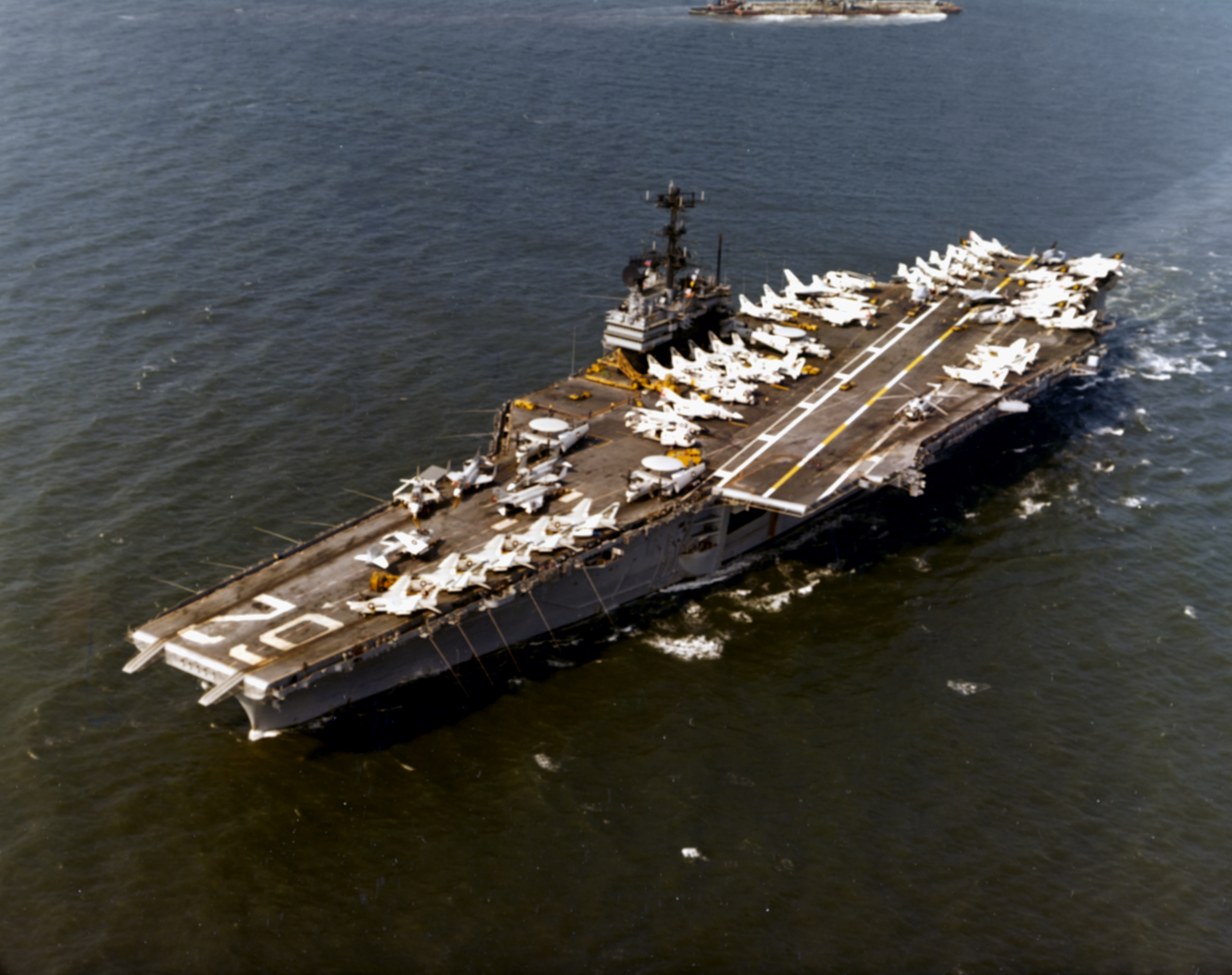
USS Independence was in service with the Sixth Fleet, in 1967

In a 1993 interview for the Johnson Presidential Library oral history archives, U.S. Secretary of Defense Robert McNamara revealed that a carrier battle group, the U.S. 6th Fleet, on a training exercise near Gibraltar was re-positioned towards the eastern Mediterranean to be able to defend Israel. The administration "thought the situation was so tense in Israel that perhaps the Syrians, fearing Israel would attack them, or the Russians supporting the Syrians might wish to redress the balance of power and might attack Israel". The Soviets learned of this deployment, which they regarded as offensive in nature, and, in a hotline message from Soviet First Secretary Alexei Kosygin, threatened the United States with war.

The Soviet Union supported its Arab allies. In May 1967, the Soviets started a surge deployment of their naval forces into the East Mediterranean. Early in the crisis they began to shadow the US and British carriers with destroyers and intelligence collecting vessels. The Soviet naval squadron in the Mediterranean was sufficiently strong to act as a major restraint on the U.S. Navy. In a 1983 interview with The Boston Globe, McNamara said that "We damn near had war". He said Kosygin was angry that "we had turned around a carrier in the Mediterranean".

In his book Six Days, veteran BBC journalist Jeremy Bowen claims that on June 4, 1967, the Israeli ship Miryam left Felixstowe with cases of machine guns, 105 mm tank shells, and armored vehicles in "the latest of many consignments of arms that had been sent secretly to Israel from British and American reserves since the crisis started" and that "Israeli transport planes had been running a 'shuttle service' in and out of RAF Waddington in Lincolnshire". Bowen claims that Harold Wilson had written to Eshkol saying that he was glad to help as long as the utmost secrecy was maintained.

== The USS Liberty incident ==
The USS Liberty incident was a "friendly fire" incident between Israeli Air Force jet fighter aircraft and Israeli Navy torpedo boats and a United States Navy technical research ship, USS Liberty, on June 8. The combined air and sea attack killed 34 crew members (naval officers, sailors, two Marines, and one civilian), wounded 171 other crew members, and severely damaged the ship. All official investigations have concluded that the attack was a case of mistaken identity; however, some reject this conclusion saying the attack was to silence the ship's intelligence-gathering communications that may have warned Egypt indirectly.

== See also ==
- 1948 Arab–Israeli War
- 1949 Armistice Agreements
- Suez Crisis
- Khartoum Resolution
- Yom Kippur War (also known as the October War)
- Syrian towns and villages depopulated in the Arab-Israeli conflict
- List of modern conflicts in the Middle East

== Notes and references ==
=== References ===
- al-Qusi, Abdallah Ahmad Hamid. (1999). Al-Wisam fi at-Ta'rikh. Cairo: Al-Mu'asasa al-'Arabiya al-Haditha. No ISBN available.
- Aloni, Shlomo (2001). Arab-Israeli Air Wars 1947–1982. Osprey Aviation. ISBN 1-84176-294-6
- Alteras, Isaac. (1993). Eisenhower and Israel: U.S.-Israeli Relations, 1953–1960, University Press of Florida. ISBN 0-8130-1205-8.
- Bailey, Sydney (1990). Four Arab-Israeli Wars and the Peace Process. London: The MacMillan Press. ISBN 0-312-04649-9.
- Bar-On, Mordechai; Morris, Benny & Golani, Motti (2002). Reassessing Israel's Road to Sinai/Suez, 1956: A "Trialogue". In Gary A. Olson (Ed.). Traditions and Transitions in Israel Studies: Books on Israel, Volume VI (pp. 3–42). SUNY Press. ISBN 0-7914-5585-8
- Bar-On, Mordechai (2006). Never-Ending Conflict: Israeli Military History, ISBN 0-275-98158-4
- Bard, Mitchell G. (2002, 2008). The Complete Idiot's Guide to Middle East Conflict. NY: Alpha books. ISBN 0-02-864410-7. 4th Edition ISBN 1-59257-791-1. Chapter 14, "Six Days to Victory" is reproduced online as The 1967 Six-Day War. at the Jewish Virtual Library of the American-Israeli Cooperative Enterprise.
- Ben-Gurion, David. (1999). Ben-gurion diary: May–June 1967. Israel Studies 4(2), 199–220.
- Black, Ian (1992). Israel's Secret Wars: A History of Israel's Intelligence Services. Grove Press. ISBN 0-8021-3286-3
- Bober, Arie (ed.) (1972). The other Israel. Doubleday Anchor. ISBN 0-385-01467-8.
- Boczek, Boleslaw Adam (2005). International Law: A Dictionary. Scarecrow Press. ISBN 0-8108-5078-8
- Borowiec, Andrew. (1998). Modern Tunisia: A Democratic Apprenticeship. Greenwood Publishing Group. ISBN 0-275-96136-2.
- Bowen, Jeremy (2003). Six Days: How the 1967 War Shaped the Middle East. London: Simon & Schuster. ISBN 0-7432-3095-7
- Brams, Steven J. & Jeffrey M. Togman. (1998). Camp David: Was the agreement fair? In Paul F. Diehl (Ed.), A Road Map to War: Territorial Dimensions of International Conflict. Nashville: Vanderbilt University Press. ISBN 0-8265-1329-8.
- Brecher, Michael. (1996). Eban and Israeli foreign policy: Diplomacy, war and disengagement. In A Restless Mind: Essays in Honor of Amos Perlmutter, Benjamin Frankel (ed.), pp. 104–117. Routledge. ISBN 0-7146-4607-5
- Bregman, Ahron. (2000). Israel's Wars, 1947–1993. Routledge. ISBN 0-415-21468-8.
- Bregman, Ahron (2002). Israel's Wars: A History Since 1947. London: Routledge. ISBN 0-415-28716-2
- Burrowes, Robert & Muzzio, Douglas. (1972). The Road to the Six Day War: Towards an Enumerative History of Four Arab States and Israel, 1965–67. The Journal of Conflict Resolution, Vol. 16, No. 2, Research Perspectives on the Arab-Israeli Conflict: A Symposium, pp. 211–226.
- Cohen, Raymond. (1988) Intercultural Communication between Israel and Egypt: Deterrence Failure before the Six-Day war. Review of International Studies, Vol. 14, No. 1, pp. 1–16
- Christie, Hazel (1999). Law of the Sea. Manchester: Manchester University Press. ISBN 0-7190-4382-4
- Churchill, Randolph & Churchill, Winston. (1967 ). The Six Day War. Houghton Mifflin Company. ISBN 0-395-07532-7
- Colaresi, Michael P. (2005). Scare Tactics: The politics of international rivalry. Syracuse University Press. ISBN 9780815630661
- Eban, Abba (1977). Abba Eban: An Autobiography. Random House. ISBN 0-394-49302-8
- Ehteshami, Anoushiravan and Hinnebusch, Raymond A. (1997). Syria & Iran: Middle Powers in a Penetrated Regional System. London: Routledge. ISBN 0-415-15675-0
- Feron, James. (1967, 13 May). Israelis ponder blow at Syrians; Some leaders decide that force is the only way to curtail terrorism. The New York Times (Fee required).
- Finkelstein, Norman (2003), Image and reality of the Israel-Palestine conflict, Verso, ISBN 1-85984-442-1
- El-Gamasy, Mohamed Abdel Ghani. (1993). The October War. The American University in Cairo Press. ISBN 977-424-316-1.
- Gawrych, George W. (2000). The Albatross of Decisive Victory: War and Policy Between Egypt and Israel in the 1967 and 1973 Arab-Israeli Wars. Greenwood Press. ISBN 0-313-31302-4. Available in multiple PDF files from the Combat Studies Institute and the Combined Arms Research Library, CSI Publications in parts Archived 2010-12-02 at the Wayback Machine.
- Gelpi, Christopher (2002). Power of Legitimacy: Assessing the Role of Norms in Crisis Bargaining. Princeton University Press. ISBN 0-691-09248-6
- Gerner, Deborah J. (1994). One Land, Two Peoples. Westview Press. ISBN 0-8133-2180-8, p. 112
- Gerteiny, Alfred G. & Ziegler, Jean (2007). The Terrorist Conjunction: The United States, the Israeli-Palestinian Conflict, and Al-Qā'ida. Greenwood Publishing Group. ISBN 0-275-99643-3, p. 142
- Gilbert, Martin. (2008). Israel – A History. McNally & Loftin Publishers. ISBN 0-688-12363-5. Chapter available online: Chapter 21: Nasser's Challenge.
- Goldstein, Erik (1992). Wars and Peace Treaties, 1816–1991. Routledge. ISBN 0-415-07822-9
- Green, Stephen J. (1984). Taking Sides: America's Secret Relations With Militant Israel. William Morrow & Co. ISBN 0-688-02643-5.
- Griffin, David J. (2006). Hawker Hunter 1951 to 2007 Lulu.com, 4 edition. ISBN 1-4303-0593-2.
- Haddad, Yvonne. (1992). Islamists and the "Problem of Israel": The 1967 Awakening. Middle East Journal, Vol. 46, No. 2, pp. 266–285.
- Hajjar, Sami G. The Israel-Syria Track, Middle East Policy, Volume VI, February 1999, Number 3. Retrieved 30 September 2006.
- Hammel, Eric (1992). Six Days in June: How Israel Won the 1967 Arab-Israeli War. Simon & Schuster. ISBN 0-7434-7535-6
- Hattendorf, John B. (2000). Naval Strategy and Power in the Mediterranean: Past, Present and Future. Taylor & Francis. ISBN 0-7146-8054-0.
- Handel, Michael I. (1973). Israel's political-military doctrine. Center for International Affairs, Harvard University. ISBN 0-87674-025-5
- Hart, Alan (1989) Arafat, A political biography. Indiana University Press ISBN 0-253-32711-3.
- Herzog, Chaim (1982). The Arab-Israeli Wars. Arms & Armour Press. ISBN 0-85368-367-0
- Herbert, Nicholas (1967, 17 May). Egyptian Forces On Full Alert: Ready to fight for Syria. The Times, p. 1; Issue 56943; col E.
- Herzog, Chaim (1989). Heroes of Israel: Profiles of Jewish Courage. Little Brown and Company. ISBN 0-316-35901-7.
- Higham, Robin. (2003). 100 Years of Air Power and Aviation. TAMU Press. ISBN 1-58544-241-0.
- Hinnebusch, Raymond A. (2003). The international politics of the Middle East. Manchester University Press. ISBN 978-0-7190-5346-7
- Israel Ministry of Foreign Affairs (2004). Background on Israeli POWs and MIAs.
- Israel Ministry of Foreign Affairs (2008). The Six-Day War (June 1967).
- "Israel Reportedly Killed POWs in '67 War; Historians Say Deaths of Hundreds of Egyptians Was Covered Up Israel Reportedly Killed POWs in '67 War; Historians Say Deaths of Hundreds of Egyptians Was Covered Up Archived 2012-11-07 at the Wayback Machine", The Washington Post, 17 August 1995, p. A.30 (Fee required).
- James, Laura (2005). The Nassar And His Enemies: Foreign Policy Decision Making In Egypt On The Eve Of The Six Day War. The Middle East Review of International Affairs. Volume 9, No. 2, Article 2.
- "Israelis Say Tape Shows Nasser Fabricated 'Plot'; Recording Said to Be of Phone Call to Hussein Gives Plan to Accuse U.S. and Britain" (PDF (subscription required)). The New York Times. 1967-06-09. p. 17.
- Jia, Bing Bing. (1998). The Regime of Straits in International Law (Oxford Monographs in International Law). Oxford University Press, USA. ISBN 0-19-826556-5.
- Koboril, Iwao and Glantz, Michael H. (1998). Central Eurasian Water Crisis. United Nations University Press. ISBN 92-808-0925-3
- Krauthammer, Charles (2007-05-18). "Prelude to the Six Days". The Washington Post. pp. A23. ISSN 0740-5421.
- Lavoy, Peter R.; Sagan, Scott Douglas & Wirtz, James J. (Eds.) (2000). Planning the Unthinkable: How New Powers Will Use Nuclear, Biological, and Chemical Weapons. Cornell University Press. ISBN 0-8014-8704-8.
- Leibler, Isi (1972). The Case For Israel. Australia: The Executive Council of Australian Jewry. ISBN 0-9598984-0-9.
- Lenczowski, George. (1990). American Presidents and the Middle East. Duke University Press. ISBN 0-8223-0972-6.
- Lyndon Baines Johnson Library. (1994). Transcript, Robert S. McNamara Oral History, Special Interview I, 3/26/93, by Robert Dallek, Internet Copy, LBJ Library. Retrieved 20 July 2010.
- McNamara: US Near War in '67. (1983, 16 Sep.). Boston Globe. P. 1. (Fee required).
- Mansour, Camille. (1994). Beyond Alliance: Israel and US Foreign Policy. Columbia University Press. ISBN 0-231-08492-7.
- Maoz, Zeev (2009). Defending the Holy Land: A Critical Analysis of Israel's Security & Foreign Policy. The University of Michigan Press. ISBN 978-0-472-03341-6
- Morris, Benny (2001) Righteous Victims New York, Vintage Books. ISBN 978-0-679-74475-7
- Miller, Benjamin. (2007). States, Nations, and the Great Powers: The Sources of Regional War and Peace. Cambridge University Press. ISBN 0-521-69161-3
- Murakami, Masahiro. (1995). Managing Water for Peace in the Middle East: Alternative Strategies Archived 2010-06-29 at the Wayback Machine. United Nations University Press. ISBN 92-808-0858-3.
- Mutawi, Samir (2002). Jordan in the 1967 War. Cambridge: Cambridge University Press. ISBN 0-521-52858-5
- Nordeen, Lon & Nicole, David. (1996). Phoenix over the Nile: A history of Egyptian Air Power 1932–1994. Washington DC: Smithsonian Institution. ISBN 1-56098-626-3.
- "Mediterranean Eskadra". (2000). Federation of American Scientists.
- Oren, Michael (2002). Six Days of War. Oxford University Press. ISBN 0-19-515174-7
- Oren, Michael. (2005). The Revelations of 1967: New Research on the Six Day War and Its Lessons for the Contemporary Middle East, Israel studies, volume 10, number 2. (Subscription required).
- Oren, Michael. (2006). "The Six-Day War", in Bar-On, Mordechai (ed.), Never-Ending Conflict: Israeli Military History. Greenwood Publishing Group. ISBN 0-275-98158-4.
- Parker, Richard B. (1996). The Six-day War: A Retrospective. University Press of Florida. ISBN 0-8130-1383-6.
- Parker, Richard B. (August 1997). "USAF in the Sinai in the 1967 War: Fact or Fiction" (PDF). Journal of Palestine Studies. XXVII (1): 67–75. doi:10.1525/jps.1997.27.1.00p0164l.
- Phythian, Mark (2001). The Politics of British Arms Sales Since 1964. Manchester: Manchester University Press. ISBN 0-7190-5907-0
- Podeh, Elie (Winter 2004). "The Lie That Won't Die: Collusion, 1967". Middle East Quarterly. 11 (1).
- Pimlott, John. (1983). Middle East Conflicts: From 1945 to the Present. Orbis. ISBN 0-85613-547-X.
- Pollack, Kenneth (2004). Arabs at War: Military Effectiveness, 1948–1991. University of Nebraska Press. ISBN 0-8032-8783-6
- Pollack, Kenneth (2005). Air Power in the Six-Day War. The Journal of Strategic Studies. 28(3), 471-503.
- Prior, Michael (1999). Zionism and the State of Israel: A Moral Inquiry. London: Routledge. ISBN 0-415-20462-3
- Quandt, William B. (2005). Peace Process: American Diplomacy and the Arab-Israeli Conflict Since 1967. Brookings Institution Press and the University of California Press; 3 edition. ISBN 0-520-24631-4
- Quigley, John B. (2005). Case for Palestine: An International Law Perspective. Duke University Press. ISBN 0-8223-3539-5
- Quigley, John B. (1990). Palestine and Israel: A Challenge to Justice. Duke University Press. ISBN 0-8223-1023-6
- Rabil, Robert G. (2003). Embattled Neighbors: Syria, Israel, and Lebanon. Lynne Rienner Publishers. ISBN 1-58826-149-2
- Rabin, Yitzhak (1996). The Rabin Memoirs. University of California Press. ISBN 0-520-20766-1.
- Rauschning, Dietrich; Wiesbrock, Katja & Lailach, Martin (eds.) (1997). Key Resolutions of the United Nations General Assembly 1946-1996. Cambridge University Press. ISBN 0-521-59704-8.
- Rikhye, Indar Jit (1980). The Sinai Blunder. London: Routledge. ISBN 0-7146-3136-1
- Robarge, David S. (2007). Getting It Right: CIA Analysis of the 1967 Arab-Israeli War Archived 2010-04-26 at the Wayback Machine, Center for the Study of Intelligence, Vol. 49 No. 1
- Rubenberg, Cheryl A. (1989). Israel and the American National Interest. University of Illinois Press. ISBN 0-252-06074-1
- Sachar, Howard M. (1976, 2007) A History of Israel from the Rise of Zionism to Our Time. New York: Alfred A. Knopf. ISBN 0-394-48564-5; ISBN 0-375-71132-5.
- Sadeh, Eligar (1997). Militarization and State Power in the Arab-Israeli Conflict: Case Study of Israel, 1948–1982. Universal Publishers. ISBN 0-9658564-6-1
- Sandler, Deborah; Aldy, Emad & Al-Khoshman Mahmoud A. (1993). Protecting the Gulf of Aqaba. – A regional environmental challenge. Environmental Law Institute. 0911937463.
- Seale, Patrick (1988). Asad: The Struggle for Peace in the Middle East. University of California Press. ISBN 0-520-06976-5
- Segev, Samuel (1967). A Red Sheet: the Six Day War.
- Segev, Tom (2005). Israel in 1967. Keter. ISBN 965-07-1370-0.
- Segev, Tom (2007). 1967: Israel, the War, and the Year that Transformed the Middle East Metropolitan Books. ISBN 978-0-8050-7057-6
- Sela, Avraham (1997). The Decline of the Arab-Israeli Conflict: Middle East Politics and the Quest for Regional Order. SUNY Press. ISBN 0-7914-3537-7
- Shafqat, Saeed (2004). Islamic world and South Asia: Rise of Islamism and Terror, Causes and Consequences?. In Kaniz F.Yusuf (Ed.) Unipolar World & The Muslim States. Islamabad: Pakistan Forum, pp 217–246.
- Shemesh, Moshe (2008). Arab Politics, Palestinian Nationalism and the Six Day War. Sussex Academic Press. ISBN 1-84519-188-9.
- Shlaim, Avi (2001). The Iron Wall: Israel and the Arab World. W. W. Norton & Company. ISBN 0-393-32112-6. ISBN 0-393-04816-0
- Shlaim, Avi (2007) Lion of Jordan: The Life of King Hussein in War and Peace Vintage Books ISBN 978-1-4000-7828-8
- Smith, Hedrick (1967-06-14). "As the Shock Wears Off; Arab World, Appraising Its Defeat, is Split as it Gropes for Strategy" (PDF subscription required). The New York Times. p. 16.
- Smith, Hedrick (1967-09-15). "Envoys Say Nasser Now Concedes U.S. Didn't Help Israel". The New York Times. pp. Page 1, Col. 5, Page 3, Col. 1.
- Stein, Janice Gross. (1991). The Arab-Israeli War of 1967: Inadvertent War Through Miscalculated Escalation, in Avoiding War: Problems of Crisis Management, Alexander L. George, ed. Boulder: Westview Press.
- Stephens, Robert H. (1971). Nasser: A Political Biography. London: Allen Lane/The Penguin Press. ISBN 0-7139-0181-0
- Stone, David (2004). Wars of the Cold War. Brassey's. ISBN 1-85753-342-9
- Tolan, Sandy (June 4, 2007). "Rethinking Israel's David-and-Goliath past". Salon. Archived from the original on 2011-02-03.
- Tucker, Spencer (2004). Tanks: An Illustrated History of Their Impact. ABC-CLIO. ISBN 1-57607-995-3
- United Nations (967, 5 June). 1347 Security Council MEETING : 5 June 1967. Provisional agenda (S/PV.1347/Rev.1). On a subpage of the website of The United Nations Information System on the Question of Palestine (UNISPAL).
- van Creveld, Martin (2004). Defending Israel: A Controversial Plan Toward Peace. Thomas Dunne Books. ISBN 0-312-32866-4
- Youngs, Tim. (2001). Developments in the Middle East Peace Process 1991–2000 London: International Affairs and Defence Section, House of Commons Library. ISSN 1368-8456.
