= Rotem Crisis =

1960 Israel-United Arab Republic confrontation

The Rotem Crisis (Hebrew: רותם; broom) was a confrontation between Israel and the United Arab Republic (UAR) in February–March 1960. Prompted by tensions along the Israeli–Syrian border, Egypt deployed its armed forces on Israel's largely undefended southern front, catching Israel off guard. Although hostilities did not break out, the crisis influenced events leading up to the 1967 Six-Day War.

== Background ==
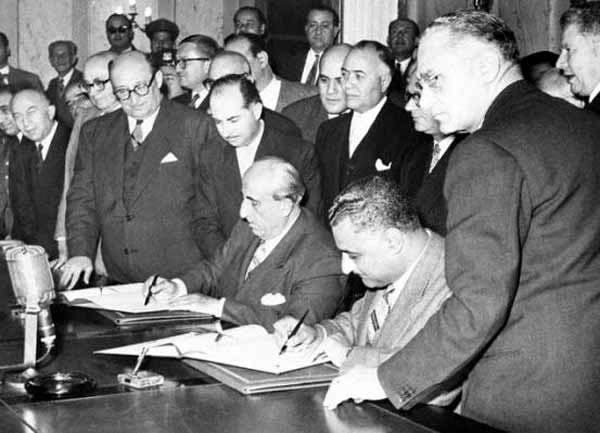
Gamal Abdel-Nasser and Shukri al-Quwatli signing the Syria-Egypt union pact, forming the United Arab Republic

Following Israel's withdrawal from Sinai, captured during the 1956 Suez Crisis, the peninsula remained de facto demilitarized of most Egyptian forces. It was garrisoned by one infantry brigade, elements of several reconnaissance regiments and up to 100 tanks. Although the outcome of the Suez Crisis had been politically positive for Egyptian president Gamal Abdel Nasser, Israel's Military Intelligence Directorate (Aman), as well as military and civilian decision makers, had regarded Israel's military victory in the war as an effective deterrent to future Egyptian designs. In early 1960, the Israeli Ministry of Foreign Affairs, therefore, estimated that Egypt would seek "to avoid a military confrontation with Israel and keep the United Nations Emergency Force" (UNEF) installed in the Gaza Strip following the crisis.

Unlike Israel's southern border, however, its northern border with Syria was prone to further conflicts, rooted in disputes over the nature and boundaries of Israel's demilitarized zones. These tensions along the border became more complicated in February 1958 with the establishment of the UAR, a short-lived political union of Egypt and Syria. Escalations on the northern border were, henceforth, likely to trigger a response on the relatively quiet front in the south.

== Crisis ==
=== Tawafiq Raid ===
In late 1959 tensions along the northern border escalated once more over Israeli cultivation rights in the southern DMZ, on the eastern shore of the Sea of Galilee. The Syrians eventually started shelling Israeli military positions with heavy mortars and, on January 31, 1960, an Israeli policeman was killed and two others were wounded. That same night, Israel's Golani Brigade carried out Operation Hargol (cricket), raiding Syrian positions in the village of al-Tawafiq. Nine Syrians were killed and 15 injured, while Israel suffered three fatalities and 17 wounded. In response, the Syrian military raised its state of alert, mobilized two reserve brigades and moved an artillery regiment and tank company closer to the border.

Arab media portrayed the Tawafiq raid as an Israeli defeat, carrying reports of heavy Israel Defense Forces (IDF) losses. It also did not make any secret of the heightened state of alert in both Egypt and Syria. In Al-Ahram on February 1, Mohamed Hassanein Heikal, friend and adviser to President Gamal Abdel Nasser, wrote that Egypt had declared a state of emergency and moved its forces to the border, where "The two armies constitute an effective pincer against Israel." Israel's military intelligence, however, found no evidence for such moves, and attributed the increased state of alert in both Egypt and Syria to fears of further Israeli attacks. Arab leaders appear to have genuinely believed Israel was preparing for an offensive. On February 8, Nasser went as far as to declare that the UAR was expecting an Israeli attack "any minute." While Israel did bolster its forces following the Syrian moves, it had made no plans to initiate hostilities and was, rather, acting to de-escalate tensions in the north.

=== Egyptian mobilization ===
As neither side actually sought confrontation, tensions appeared to subside towards the second week of February. Israeli forces were recalled from the north. On February 12, however, two Israeli soldiers on patrol were killed by Syrian fire near Lake Hula. Although Israel responded with stern warnings, both sides initially remained calm. Yet beginning on February 15 and 16, the UAR began receiving intelligence of Israeli preparations for an attack on Syria. These included news of large IDF concentrations in the Galilee, mobilization of reserve formations, the closing off of Haifa Port for military shipments, the recall of pilots and officers from abroad, and sharp debates between Israel's leaders. Most of this intelligence, probably supplied by the Soviet Union, was untrue, yet the leadership of the UAR was convinced of an impending Israeli attack, probably scheduled for February 22.

Nasser had apparently come to believe that the state of alert publicly declared after the Tawafiq incident had succeeded in deterring Israel from attacking Syria. Now that Israel was allegedly deploying its forces again, Nasser (probably on February 16) ordered the Egyptian army into the Sinai. Advanced detachments of the Egyptian army began crossing the Suez Canal on February 17 and between February 22 and 24 both the 2nd Infantry Division and 4th Armored Division moved into Sinai in radio silence. By February 27, 6 out of Egypt's 10 infantry brigades and all three Egyptian armoured brigades were in place. UAR forces on the Syrian front comprised seven additional brigades.

Aman had gotten wind of the Egyptian decision to mobilize soon after it was taken, yet political fears of exasperating the already tense situation along the border delayed much needed reconnaissance flights. Only on February 23, after an American tip-off, did an Israeli Air Force (IAF) Sud-Ouest Vautour photograph the Suez Canal zone to bring back news that the 4th Armored Division had in fact left its garrison. A second flight over the Sinai a day later revealed the full extent of the Egyptian deployment. Egyptian forces had deployed both close to the border and in depth, and Israel's forces in the Negev, consisting of between 20 and 30 tanks, were now facing 500 Egyptian tanks and SU-100 tank destroyers.

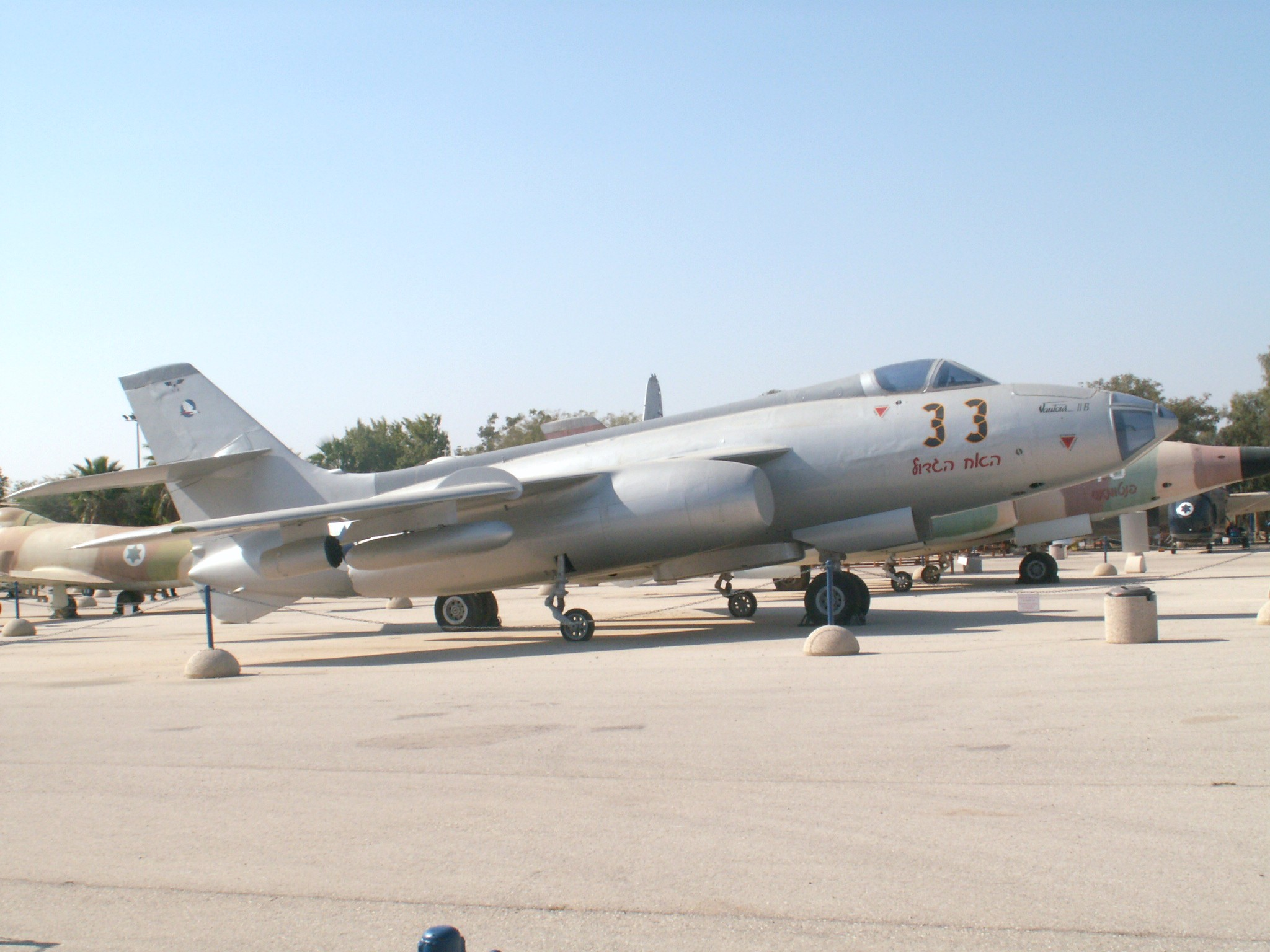
Sud-Ouest Vautour IIB 33 "Big Brother" at the Israeli Air Force Museum. This aircraft conducted both IAF reconnaissance flights on February 23 and 24.

=== Israeli response ===
On February 25 IDF Chief of Operations Yitzhak Rabin sent Ezer Weizman, commander in chief of the IAF, a note saying: "We've been caught with our pants down. During the next twenty four hours everything depends on the air force." Israel had been caught off guard and the General Staff of the Israel Defense Forces now issued a set of orders, codenamed "Rotem," for an emergency movement of forces. Israel's plans for the defense of the south had called for the deployment of four brigades. Prime Minister David Ben-Gurion refused the IDF's request for a massive mobilization of reserves, but authorized the call-up of 7,000 men, the minimum required to maintain a heightened state-of-alert for a prolonged amount of time. Thus the units deployed in the next 24 hours were mostly regular army units. The 1st Golani Brigade and the 7th Armored Brigade deployed to the northern Negev, near the Rafah Opening, while the 35th Paratroopers Brigade and 37th Mechanized Brigade held the Ketziot region. As these moved into position, the air force was instructed to prepare for immediate action against Egyptian forces in the Sinai.

Beyond the immediate danger of an Egyptian attack on its inadequate defenses, however, Israel also faced two additional threats. First, the massing of forces along both sides of the border could, even inadvertently, deteriorate into open warfare. Furthermore, a massive Egyptian presence on the border would force Israel to maintain its forces, mostly reserve troops, in the south for an indeterminate amount of time, a drain on national resources. These could also have repercussions on other points of conflict, such as Israeli shipping in the Red Sea. Ben-Gurion had refused a massive call-up of reservists in order to keep a low profile and prevent actions that might be deemed provocative, and also refused to allow additional reconnaissance flights over the Sinai. Censorship prevented the media from reporting the heightened state-of-alert, and Ben-Gurion met with newspaper editors to brief them on what they should not report.

=== United Nations role ===
Israel turned to the diplomatic front. In overtures to the United States and the United Nations it stressed both the increased Arab military presence on its borders and the faulty Arab intelligence regarding its intentions towards Syria. UN Secretary General Dag Hammarskjöld was asked to intervene with Cairo, but told Israeli diplomats he did not consider the situation dire enough to take action, and that a dramatic change in his plans would only serve to exacerbate tensions. This response enraged Israeli Foreign Minister Golda Meir. On February 25, she asked Israel's representative at the UN, Yosef Tekoah, to speak to Hammarskjold again, regarding rumored Egyptian deployment in the Gaza Strip and the possible evacuation of the UN Emergency Force. Israeli officials were also upset that UN military personnel did not inform Israel of significant Egyptian military moves in the Gaza region, despite the previous practice of doing so. Hammarskjold would only suggest a visit to the region "in the near future," or a meeting with Ben-Gurion during his upcoming visit the US. He pointed out that Egypt had informed the UN of the February 23 reconnaissance flight yet had not filed an official complaint, an indication of its own reluctance to escalate the crisis. It is unclear whether Hammarskjold had ever contacted Cairo regarding Israeli concerns, and Ben-Gurion soon concluded Hammarskjold could not be counted on for assistance.

=== De-escalation ===
Just as Egyptian forces were completing their deployment, Aman begun picking up indications of a decrease in Egypt's military state of alert. On February 27, Egyptian Air Force exercises resumed, and more such indications arrived in subsequent days. In light of this, Ben-Gurion and IDF Chief-of-Staff Haim Laskov authorized the demobilization of 6,000–7,000 Israeli troops, and the 7th and 35th brigades returned to routine standing. Although Egyptian forces were still fully deployed, all but 400 Israeli reservists had been discharged by March 5.

On March 9, Egyptian forces also started to withdraw, starting with the 2nd division and followed in the second half of the month by the 4th. An editorial in Al-Ahram on the same day described the crisis from the Egyptian perspective: an Egyptian deployment had prevented Israel from attacking Syria, prompting the Israeli cabinet to act diplomatically rather than militarily. The Egyptian media, mostly silent on the affair since February 24, described the outcome as a brilliant victory for the Egyptian army.

== Aftermath ==
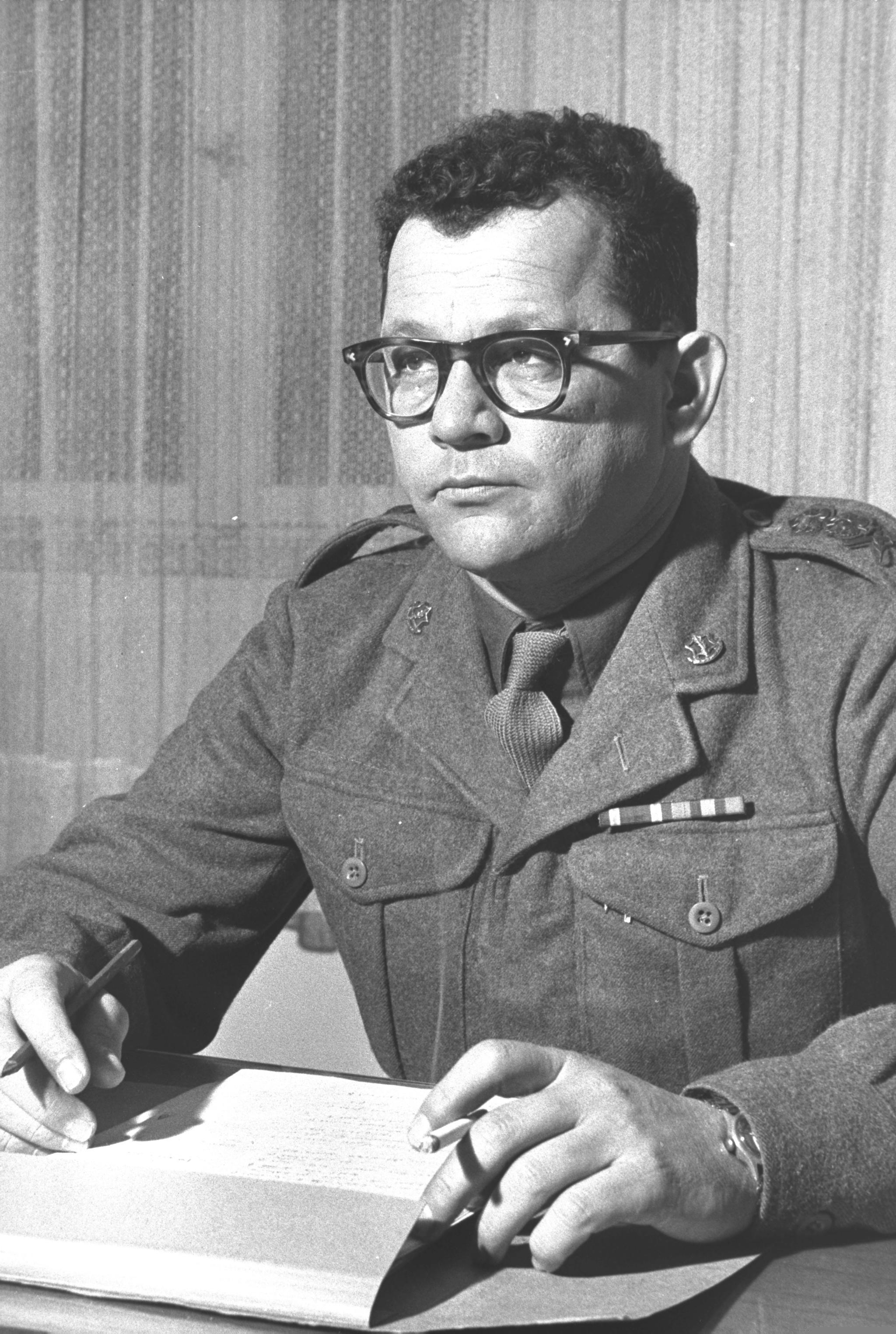
Chief of the IDF General Staff at the time of the Rotem Crisis, Rav Aluf Haim Laskov

Although neglected in the historiography of the Arab–Israeli conflict, the Rotem Crisis was the most serious challenge to Israel's doctrine of deterrence in the years between the Suez Crisis and the Six-Day War. Haim Laskov described it as the most dramatic event of his tenure. It revealed deficiencies in the Israeli intelligence community, which failed to provide warning of an imminent threat, and in the IDF's ability to translate such warnings into immediate action. Although intelligence had suggested Egyptian forces were on the move, a week went by before the full extent of the Egyptian deployment came to light and countermeasures were taken. Rabin, a future Chief-of-Staff, later wrote that Israeli intelligence had never been in worse shape. Laskov had lost all faith in the head of military intelligence, Chaim Herzog, but was prevented from dismissing him by Ben-Gurion. The crisis influenced Israeli national security policy, defining any Egyptian military build-up along its border as unacceptable, while the Israeli intelligence community took extensive measures to improve its collection capabilities.

The crisis has come to be regarded as a "trial run" for the events that led to the 1967 Six-Day War. Israel and Egypt had drawn very different conclusions from the crisis. While the former came to believe new and restrictive rules had been set in place, the latter believed that it had gained more room to maneuver, able to deter Israel by the deployment of forces without the actual necessity of going to war. When, in 1967, Nasser once again moved the Egyptian army into the Sinai following renewed reports of tension along the Israeli-Syrian border, many in the IDF General Staff were reminded of events in 1960. Both Rabin and Weizman, in their respective memoirs, noted that events in 1967 at first seemed like a repeat of the Rotem crisis, and that lessons drawn from the first were applied in the second. There was initially little thought of war. In 1992, retired Major-General Jamal Mat'lum, Director of the Egyptian Army's Center for Strategic Studies, also noted the role played by the Rotem Crisis in Egyptian decision making in 1967:

There was an incident in 1960, when Israel deployed against Syria and Egypt reacted and concentrated most of its forces in Sinai, and Israel refrained. The Egyptian leadership may have imagined the possibility of a show of military force that would end without war, as had happened in 1960.

Yet while the Egyptian deployment in 1960 had been discreet, in 1967 it was carried out in full view of the public. The new deployment evoked widespread enthusiasm in the Arab world, leaving the various players with less room to maneuver. Nasser demanded the withdrawal of UNEF and the crisis soon gathered a momentum of its own, eventually leading to war.

== See also ==
- Retribution operations
- Origins of the Six-Day War
