= Indar Jit Rikhye =

Indian general

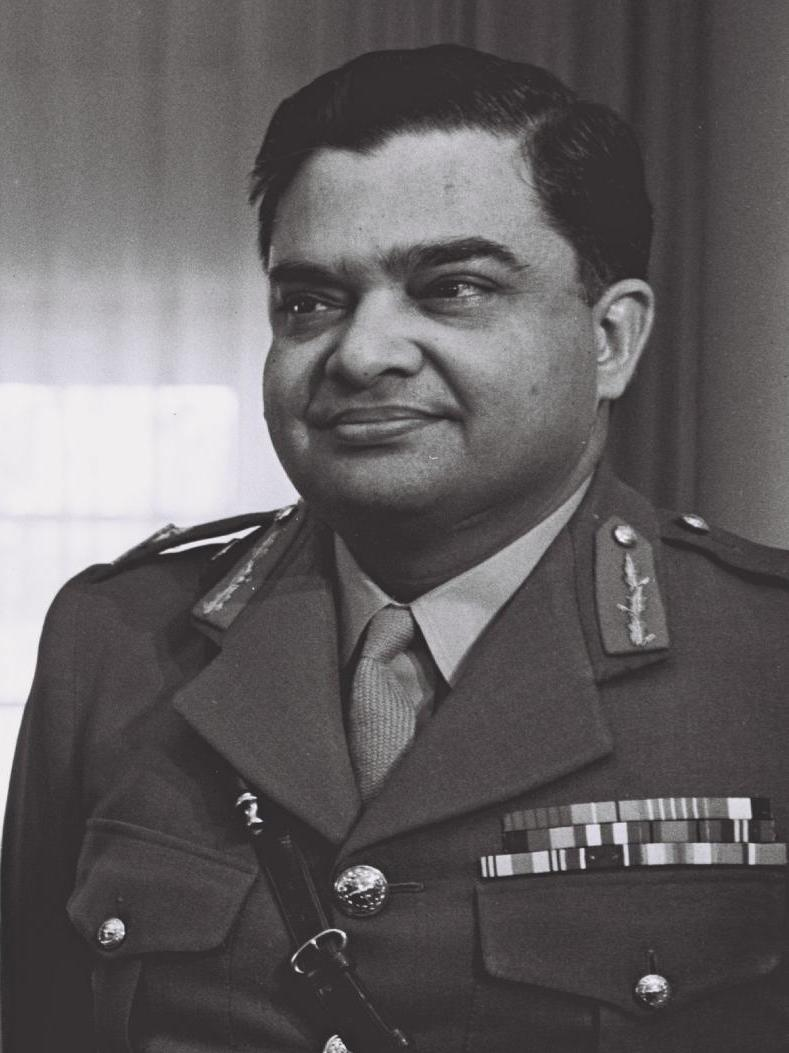
- Born: 30 July 1920; Lahore, Punjab Province, British India (now Punjab, Pakistan)
- Died: 21 May 2007 (aged 86); Charlottesville, Virginia, U.S.
- Military career
- Allegiance: British India; India
- Branch: British Indian Army; Indian Army
- Service years: 1940–1978
- Rank: Major General
- Units: 6th Duke of Connaught's Own Lancers (Watson's Horse) -1947; 7th Light Cavalry 1947-1950?
- Commands: United Nations Emergency Force Jan. 1966 – June 1967
- Conflicts: World War II

Major General Indar Jit Rikhye (30 July 1920 – 21 May 2007) was an Indian Army General, United Nations official, peace advocate and author.

Rikhye served as part of UN Peace Keeping force and as a military adviser to the United Nations Secretary-General Dag Hammarskjöld and U Thant in the 1960s.

== Personal life ==
Rikhye's father Dr. Madan Lal Rikhye had graduated as a medical professional in 1912 and served in British Indian Army as a medical officer with rank of a Captain.

After retirement he lived in Charlottesville, Virginia where he died of respiratory failure.

== Career in British Indian Army and Indian Army ==
Gen. Rikhye (pronounced Rickey) had a distinguished 30-year career in the Indian Army. He attended the Indian Military Academy, Dehradun and was commissioned in December 1940. He served with the 6th Duke of Connaught's Own Lancers (Watson's Horse) during World War II. In 1947 he saw action in Jammu and Kashmir commanding 'B' Squadron 7th Light Cavalry. He went on to command the Deccan Horse Apr 1948 - Feb 1951.

== Career with United Nations ==
Starting in the late 1950s he was assigned to U.N. peacekeeping units.

As military advisor, he was responsible for operations in the Democratic Republic of the Congo, Rwanda, Burundi, West Irian, Yemen, and Cyprus. Special assignments included advisor to the Secretary-General during the Cuban Missile Crisis, chief of the UN Observer Mission to the Dominican Republic, and participant in the Spinelli-Rikhye Mission to Jordan and Israel in 1965.

In May 1967, General Rikhye was the commander of the United Nations Emergency Force in the Sinai Peninsula when Egypt deployed its own troops in that territory and demanded that Rikhye withdraw all his troops. While waiting for evacuation to occur, UNEF came under fire during beginning of Six-Day War.

== Post-United Nations ==
From 1970 to 1990, he was president of the International Peace Academy, a New York-based organization that promotes the settlement of armed conflicts by training negotiators, diplomats and military personnel in peacekeeping.

== List of selected publications ==
- The Thin Blue Line: International Peacekeeping and its Future
- The Sinai Blunder (1980)
