= Mike Shuster =

American journalist (1947–2023)

- Born: July 7, 1947; Philadelphia, Pennsylvania, U.S.
- Died: November 6, 2023 (aged 76); Los Angeles, California, U.S.
- Occupation: Diplomatic correspondent
- Years active: 1969–2023
- Known for: Work for National Public Radio

Mike Shuster (July 7, 1947 – November 6, 2023) was an American journalist and blogger. He served as a diplomatic correspondent and a roving foreign correspondent for National Public Radio in the United States, where he filed over 3,000 stories by the time of his retirement in 2013.

== Early life and education ==
Mike Shuster was born in Philadelphia on July 7, 1947, to Morris Merle Shuster and Beatrice Ritta Gerber Shuster. He studied at Williams College in Williamstown, Massachusetts.

== Career ==
After moving to New York in the late 1960s, Shuster was a photographer and editor at Liberation News Service in New York from 1969 until 1975, a supplier of reports, photos, and graphics for the underground press in the United States. In 1970 and 1976, Shuster traveled around Africa working as a freelance foreign affairs reporter. His reporting trip in 1970 culminated in a three-week visit to the liberated zones of Guinea-Bissau, a former Portuguese colony. Several years later, he spent five months reporting on Angola. At the time, Angola was the scene of a war involving three factions fighting for power in the post-colonial African territory.

Between 1975 and 1980, Shuster was a United Nations correspondent for Pacifica News Service where he covered the election of Robert Mugabe in 1980 in Zimbabwe.

=== Career with NPR ===
Shuster joined NPR in 1980 as a freelance reporter where he was responsible for covering business and the economy. He also worked as an editor for Weekend Edition. First situated in New York, his reporting on mobster John Gotti in 1989 was credited with an FCC decision which relaxed their ban on the broadcast of expletives. As a foreign correspondent, he reported from Tehran, Islamabad, Berlin, Moscow, and Israel and the West Bank.

In September 1989, he was sent to London, where he was senior editor of the London bureau; he travelled to Germany monthly to report on their reunification, and he witnessed the fall of the Berlin Wall. In early 1991, he travelled to Saudi Arabia to report on the first Gulf War.

In late 1991, he was sent to Moscow as NPR Bureau Chief, where he reported on the collapse of the Soviet Union and subsequent rise of independent post-Soviet states. He covered the U.S. invasion of Iraq, and reported on armed conflicts in Georgia and other former republics of the Soviet Union.

While stationed in Israel, he reported on the Second Intifada, the Israeli withdrawal from the Gaza Strip in 2005, and the 2006 Lebanon War.

Shuster was one of a few American reporters to spend extended time in Iraq after 2004. There, he produced a 2007 series, The Partisans of Ali, which explored Shiite faith and politics. Two years later, he reported on the 2009 elections and subsequent protests.

Shuster retired from NPR in 2013. During his time at NPR, he filed over 3,000 stories.

== Later life ==
After retiring, Shuster began producing and writing on a freelance basis. At the time of his death, he was the executive producer of The Great War Project, a website examining the impact of World War I on the world a century after it ended. He worked on television projects and on the Presidential World War I Centennial Commission. He was a senior fellow at UCLA's Burkle Center for International Relations.

== Personal life and death ==
Shuster died from complications of Parkinson's disease in Los Angeles, California, on November 6, 2023, at age 76.

== Honors and awards ==
Shuster won a number of awards, including:

- Peabody Award for his team's coverage of September 11
- Alfred I. duPont-Columbia University Awards for coverage of the Iraq War (2007 and 2004); September 11 and the war in Afghanistan (2003); and the Gulf War (1992)
- Overseas Press Club Lowell Thomas Award in 2003 for "The Middle East: A Century of Conflict"
- First in Documentary Reporting from the National Headliner Awards
- Honorable mention from the Overseas Press Club in 1999
- SAJA Journalism Award in 1998
