= The Rabin Memoirs =

1979 book by Yitzhak Rabin

- Author: Yitzhak Rabin
- Original title: Service Notebook
- Language: English
- Subject: Autobiography / memoir
- Genre: Non-fiction
- Publisher: University of California Press
- Publication date: 1979
- Publication place: United States
- Pages: 633 (2 Vol.)
- ISBN: 0-520-20766-1

The Rabin Memoirs (Hebrew: פנקס שירות Service Notebook) is an autobiography and a memoir of Yitzhak Rabin published in 1979, which Rabin co-authored with journalist Dov Goldstein. The book made a number of scandals at the time, due to the blunt language it used to describe different figures from the political leadership of Israel at the time, and especially due to a description of Shimon Peres, Rabin's political rival, as "an indefatigable subversive" (or "tireless schemer," Hebrew: "החתרן הבלתי נלאה"), a nickname that stuck to the latter. The book was published in two volumes.

== Overview ==
In the book Rabin reviews his stations in life until the time of the writing of the book, including his childhood, fighting in the Palmach, his military career, his tenure as ambassador to the United States and as Prime Minister of Israel. Among other things, Rabin wrote about controversial affairs: the expulsion of the Arabs during the 1948 Arab–Israeli War, the sinking of Altalena and more. However, most media attention focused on his beliefs about his partner at the labor Party – Shimon Peres. Rabin ruled that Peres is "Disqualified from serving as prime minister". Journalist Nissim Mishal first revealed the information from reading the book in draft form, on the eve of its publication. Rabin was especially angry about the leaks from Peres and his associates to the press, at Rabin's first tenure as prime minister. Peres referred to the book as "a typo in Israeli politics".

Rabin's critics claim, in addition to the harsh tone, that there are many inaccuracies, showing, if anything, the perception of reality by Rabin, but not historical facts. For example, historian Michael Bar-Zohar (considered a supporter of Shimon Peres) said that "the chapters in which [Rabin] talks about Operation Entebbe, he simply wrote things that do not correspond to the truth. [...] personal feelings are allowed to be expressed in an autobiography, but when you're not precise with the facts about an important event like Entebbe, to say the least, it's just not fair".

== Previous editions ==
The first English edition was a translation from the Hebrew Service Notebook, written with Peretz Kidron and published in 1979 by Little, Brown and Company.
