= Water politics in the Jordan River basin =

Political issues arising from or related to the water of the Jordan River

Coordinates: 33°14′55″N 35°39′09″E

River Jordan Arabic: نهر الأردن, nahr al-urdun, Hebrew: נהר הירדן, nehar hayarden
- Etymology: Greek: Ιορδάνης < Hebrew: ירדן (yardén, "descender") < ירד

Location
- Country: Israel, Jordan, State of Palestine, Syria
- Region: West Asia
- City: Jericho

Physical characteristics
- Source: Hasbani
  - location: Lebanon
- Length: 251 km (156 mi)
- Discharge
  - location: Dead Sea

Basin features
- Tributaries
  - left: Banias, Dan River (Israel), Jalud
  - right: Yarmouk, Jabbok, Jabesh (Wadi Yabis)

Water politics in the Jordan River basin refers to political issues of water within the Jordan River drainage basin, including competing claims and water usage, and issues of riparian rights of surface water along transnational rivers, as well as the availability and usage of ground water. Water resources in the region are scarce, and these issues directly affect the five political subdivisions (Israel, the West Bank, Lebanon, Syria and Jordan) located within and bordering the basin, which were created since the collapse, during World War I, of the former single controlling entity, the Ottoman Empire. Because of the scarcity of water and a unique political context, issues of both supply and usage outside the physical limits of the basin have been included historically.

The Jordan river basin and its water are central issues of both the Arab–Israeli conflict (including Israeli–Palestinian conflict), as well as the more recent Syrian civil war. The Jordan River is 251 kilometres (156 mi) long and, over most of its distance, flows at elevations below sea level. Its waters originate from the high precipitation areas in and near the Anti-Lebanon Mountains in the north, and flow through the Sea of Galilee and Jordan River Valley ending in the Dead Sea at an elevation of minus 400 metres, in the south.

== Geography of Jordan basin ==
Downstream of the Sea of Galilee, where the main tributaries enter the Jordan Valley from the east, the valley bottom widens to about 15 miles (24 km). This area is characterized by higher alluvial or beach terraces paralleling the river; this area is known as the Ghor (or Ghawr). These terraces are locally incised by side wadis or rivers forming a maze of ravines, alternating with sharp crests and rises, with towers, pinnacles and a badlands morphology.

At a lower elevation is the active Jordan River floodplain, the zhor (or Zur), with a wildly meandering course, which accounts for the excessive length of the river in comparison to the straight-line distance to reach the Dead Sea. Small dams were built along the river within the Zhor, turning the former thickets of reeds, tamarisk, willows, and white poplars into irrigated fields. After flowing through the Zur, the Jordan drains into the Dead Sea across a broad, gently sloping delta.

In the upper Jordan river basin, upstream of the Sea of Galilee, the tributaries include:

- The Hasbani (Arabic: الحاصباني), Snir (Hebrew: שניר), which flows from Lebanon.
- The Banias (Arabic: بانياس), Hermon (Hebrew: חרמון), arising from a spring at Banias near the foot of Mount Hermon.
- The Dan (Hebrew: דן), Leddan (Arabic: اللدان), whose source is also at the base of Mount Hermon.
- Berdara (Arabic: دردره), or Braghith (Arabic: براغيث), The Iyon or Ayoun (Hebrew: עיון), a smaller stream which also flows from Lebanon.

The lower Jordan River tributaries include:

- The Jalud in the Beth Shean valley
- The Yarmouk River, which originates on the south-eastern slopes of Mount Hermon and the Hauran Plateau, forms the southern limit of the Golan Heights and flows into the Jordan River below the Sea of Galilee. It also defines portions of the border between Jordan and Syria, as well as a shorter portion between Jordan and Israel.
- The Zarqa River, the Biblical Jabbok
- Jabesh (Wadi Yabis) named after Jabesh-Gilead

== Hydrology of the Jordan River ==
The riparian rights to the Jordan River are shared by 4 different countries: Lebanon, Syria, Jordan, Israel as well as the Palestinian territories; although Israel as the occupying authority has refused to give up any of the water resources to the Palestinian National Authority. The Jordan River originates near the borders of three countries, Israel, Lebanon, and Syria, with most of the water derived from the Anti-Lebanon Mountains and Mount Hermon to the north and east. Three spring-fed headwater rivers converge to form the Jordan River in the north:

1. The Hasbani River, which rises in south Lebanon, with an average annual flow of 138 million cubic metres,
2. The Dan River, in Israel, averaging 245 million cubic metres per year, and
3. The Banias River flowing from the Golan Heights, averaging 121 million cubic metres per year.

These streams converge six kilometres inside Israel and flow south to the Sea of Galilee, wholly within Israel.

Water quality is variable in the river basin. The three tributaries of the upper Jordan have a low salinity of about 20 ppm. The salinity of water in Lake Tiberias ranges from 240 ppm in the upper end of the lake (marginal for irrigation water), to 350 ppm (too high for sensitive citrus fruits) where it discharges back into the Jordan River. The salt comes from the saline subterranean springs. These springs pass through the beds of ancient seas and then flow into Lake Tiberias, as well as the groundwater sources that feed into the lower Jordan. Downstream of Tiberias, the salinity of the tributary Yarmouk River is also satisfactory, at 100 ppm, but the lower Jordan river becomes progressively more saline as it flows south. It reaches twenty-five percent salinity (250,000 ppm) where it flows in the Dead Sea, which is about seven times saltier than the ocean.

As a resource for freshwater the Jordan River drainage system is vital for most of the population of Palestine, Israel and Jordan, and to a lesser extent in Lebanon and Syria who are able to use water from other national sources. (Although Syrian riparian rights to the Euphrates has been severely restricted by Turkey's dam building programme, a series of 21 dams and 17 hydroelectric stations built on the Euphrates and Tigris rivers, in the 1980s, 90s and projected to be completed in 2010, in order to provide irrigation water and hydroelectricity to the arid area of southeastern Turkey.) The CIA analysis in the 1980s placed the Middle East on the list of possible conflict zones because of water issues. Twenty per cent of the region’s population lack access to adequate potable water and 35% of the population lack appropriate sanitation.

Sharing water resources involves the issue of water use, water rights, and distribution of amounts. The Palestinian National Authority wished to expand and develop the agricultural sector in the West Bank to decrease their dependency on the Israeli labour market, while Israel have prevented an increase in the irrigation of the West Bank. Jordan also wishes to expand its agricultural sector so as to be able to achieve food security.

On 21 May 1997, the UN General Assembly adopted a Convention on the Law of Non-navigational Uses of International Watercourses.

The articles establish two principles for the use of international watercourses (other than navigation): "equitable and reasonable utilization". and "the 'due diligence' obligation not to cause significant harm." Equitable and reasonable utilization requires taking into account all relevant factors and circumstances, including:

- (a) Geographic, hydrographic, hydrological, climatic, ecological and other factors of a natural character;
- (b) The social and economic needs of the watercourse States concerned;
- (c) The population dependent on the watercourse in each watercourse State;
- (d) The effects of the use or uses of the watercourses in one watercourse State on other watercourse States;
- (e) Existing and potential uses of the watercourse;
- (f) Conservation, protection, development and economy of use of the water resources of the watercourse and the costs of measures taken to that effect;
- (g) The availability of alternatives, of comparable value, to a particular planned or existing use.

== Historical timeline ==
=== Ottoman and Mandatory periods ===
Studies of regional water resources and their development, in modern terms, date from the early 1900s during the period of Ottoman rule; they also follow in light of a significant engineering milestone and resource development achievement. Based largely on geographic, engineering and economic considerations many of these plans included common components, but political considerations and international events would soon follow.

After the First World War, the Jordan River Basin began to be seen as a problem of quantitative allocations. In the late 1930s and mid-1940s, Transjordan and the World Zionist Organization commissioned mutually exclusive competing water resource studies. The Transjordanian study, performed by Michael G. Ionides, concluded that the available water resources are not sufficient to sustain a Jewish state which would be the destination for Jewish immigration. The Zionist study, by the American engineer Walter Clay Lowdermilk, concluded that by diverting water from the Jordan basin to support agriculture and residential development in the Negev, a Jewish state supporting 4 million new immigrants would be sustainable.

Below is a brief timeline summarizing policy attempts related to sharing water in the Jordan River Basin between 1922 and 1940s.

year	policy	objective
1922	British Palestine Mandate	Formalized British rule in the Southern part of Ottoman Syria from 1923 to 1948. Also expressed favor for establishing Palestine as a Jewish State.
1926	Rutenberg Concession	Pinhas Rutenberg was a Jewish Zionist entrepreneur who was the driving force behind electricity in Palestine. This concession granted to utilize the waters of the Auja basin as well as Jordan and Yarmouk Rivers for the generation and supply of electricity in Palestine, with the building of the First Jordan Hydro-Electric Power House.
1936	First regional water project delivered water to Western Galilee	working toward establishing continuous flow of replenishable water source to the area.
1937	Founding of Mekorot	to perform and complete all goals and needs associated with distributing, measuring and producing water.
1939	Ionides Plan	Contained three recommendations: Yarmouk river floodwaters be diverted and stored in the Kinneret, that these stored waters be diverted and used to provide irrigation for lands east of the Jordan River, and that irrigation water in the Jordan River be primarily used for lands within the Jordan River Basin.
1944	Lowdermilk Plan	Suggested by Walter C. Lowdermilk, this was a plan to dig a seawater canal from Haifa Bay to the Dead Sea to generate hydroelectric power on a vast scale.

=== Post-Mandatory period ===
At the end of the 1948 Arab Israeli War with the signing of the General Armistice Agreements in 1949, both Israel and Jordan embarked on implementing their competing initiatives to utilize the water resources in the areas under their control.

The first "Master Plan for Irrigation in Israel" was drafted in 1950 and approved by a Board of Consultants (of the USA) on 8 March 1956. The main features of the Master Plan was the construction of the Israeli National Water Carrier (NWC), a project for the integration of all major regional projects into the Israeli national grid. Tahal – Water Planning for Israel Ltd., an Israeli public corporate body, was established in 1952, being largely responsible for planning of water development, drainage, etc., at the national level within Israel, including the NWC project which was commissioned in 1965.

In 1952, the Bunger plan was issued by Jordan in collaboration with UNRWA and US Technical Cooperation Agency's Point IV program, aiming to provide water to 100,000 resettled Palestinian refugees, to be relocated into Northern Jordan. The plan included construction of major Maqarin dam over Yarmouk river to store some 500 million cubic meters of water and serve Jordan and Syria, allowing Jordan to avoid from storing water in the mostly Israeli-controlled Lake Tiberias. The Maqarin dam was also designated to provide electricity, while a smaller dam at Adasiya was supposed to divert Yarmouk-originated water to the Jordanian East Ghor Canal, aimed to irrigate Jordanian areas east to the Jordan river. A plan was also issued concerning the West Ghor Canal, envisioning a siphone to irrigate also the West Bank. In March 1953, Jordan and UNRWA signed a preliminary agreement to implement the Bunger plan. Shortly, in June 1953, Jordan and Syria signed a complementary treaty in this regard. Despite the expected objection of Israel, Jordan moved with the plan and in July 1953 allocated funding for the project in collaboration with UNRWA and US Government, pending later agreement with Israel. The Israeli government protested to US over the Maqarin dam plan, over not taking into account its rights on the Yarmouk waters downstream. While Israel convinced the US to pause the project until the issue is resolved, it also offered its eagerness to discuss it with the Arab governments.

In 1953, Israel began construction of a water carrier to take water from the Sea of Galilee to the populated center and agricultural south of the country, while Jordan concluded an agreement with Syria, known as the Bunger plan, to dam the Yarmouk River near Maqarin, and utilize its waters to irrigate Jordanian territory, before they could flow to the Sea of Galilee. Military clashes ensued, and US President Dwight Eisenhower dispatched ambassador Johnston to the region to work out a plan that would regulate water usage.

Below is a brief timeline summarizing policy attempts related to sharing water in the Jordan River Basin between 1951 and 1955.

year	policy	objective
1951	Murdoch Macdonald Corporation Report commissioned by Jordanian Government	proposed extension of irrigation in the Jordan Valley.
1952	Main Plan	Favored primary in-basin use of Jordan waters and ruled out integration of the Litani River. It designated provisional quotas to Israel, Jordan and Syria.
1952	Bunger Plan	issued by Jordan in collaboration with UNRWA and US Technical Cooperation Agency's Point IV program – aiming to provide water to 100,000 resettled Palestinian refugees, to be relocated into Northern Jordan.
1953	Construction of National Water Carrier begins	To transfer water from Kinneret to the center of the country and the dry southern region. Enabled efficient use of water and regulation of the water supply in the country.
1953	Initial Johnston Plan	The attainment of an agreement which guaranteed the availability of water for the irrigation of crops for populations surrounding the Jordan River Basin.
1954	Cotton Plan	Israel's counter-proposal to the Main Plan, which included the Litani river, required out-of-basin transfers and identified Lake Tiberias as a storage facility.
1954	Arab Plan	Offered by the Arab League Technical Committee as another counter proposal to the Main Plan, it excluded the Litani River, promoted in-basin use, and rejected storage in Lake Tiberias.
1955	Modified Johnston Report	Designated water consumption of the Jordan River; 60% was to be used by Lebanon, Syria and Jordan, with the remaining 40% to be allocated to Israel. It postponed discussions on the use of Lake Tiberias as storage for five years.

Between 1955 and the beginning of the Oslo Process, there was little attempt at policy making in regards to shared bodies of water.

=== Six-Day War and aftermath ===
On 10 June 1967, the last day of the Six-Day War, Golani Brigade forces quickly invaded the village of Banias where a caliphate era Syrian fort stood. Eshkol's priority on the Syrian front was control of the water sources.

=== Regional stagnation (1980s) ===
In 1980, Syria unilaterally started a programme of dam building along the Yarmouk.

The southern slopes of Mount Hermon (Jebel esh-Sheikh) as well as the Western Golan Heights, were unilaterally annexed by Israel in 1981.

In 1988, the Syrian-Jordanian agreement on development of the Yarmouk was blocked when Israel, as a riparian right holder, refused to ratify the plan and the World Bank withheld funding. Israel's augmented its Johnson plan allocation of 25,000,000 m³/yr by a further 45,000,000–75,000,000 m³/yr.

=== Jordanian-Israeli peace deal and aftermath ===
The water agreement formed a part of the broader political treaty which was signed between Israel and Jordan in 1994, and the articles relating to water in this agreement did not correspond to Jordan’s rights to water as they had originally been claimed. The nature and significance of the wider 1994 treaty meant that the water aspect was forced to cede importance and priority in negotiations, giving way to areas such as borders and security in terms of armed force, which were perceived by decision-makers as being the most integral issues to the settlement. Main points from the water sharing in the Jordan/Israel Peace treaty.

Jordan being a country that borders on the Jordan has riparian rights to water from the Jordan basin and upper Jordan tributaries. Due to the water diversion projects the flow to the river Jordan has been reduced from 1,300 million–1,500 million cubic metres to 250 million–300 million cubic metres. Where the water quality has been further reduced as the flow of the river Jordan is made of run-off from agricultural irrigation and saline springs.

Problems can be seen to have emerged in 1999, when the treaty’s limitations were revealed by events concerning water shortages in the Jordan basin. A reduced supply of water to Israel due to drought meant that, in turn, Israel which is responsible for providing water to Jordan, decreased its water provisions to the country, provoking a diplomatic disagreement between the two and bringing the water component of the treaty back into question.

Israel's complaints that the reduction in water from the tributaries to the river Jordan caused by the Jordanian-Syrian dam look to go unheeded due to the conflict of interest between Israel and her neighbours.

=== Syrian Civil War and its effect on Jordan basin ===
The dramatic drought, which hit Levant between 1998 and 2012, was identified by scientists to be the most severe in 900 years. The dramatic effect of the drought on southern Syria is proposed as one of the factors which led to the eruption of the Syrian Civil War.

Historically, prior to the eruption of Syrian War in 2011, the Syrian government had developed a series of 21 dams in the Yarmouk drainage basin to divert water into large reservoirs used for irrigation of agricultural land. Jordan had built a large dam of its own on the Yarmouk, the Al-Wehda Dam, in order to exploit the water for its own agriculture. However, prior to the Syrian War, the amount of water it collected by Jordanian dam had fallen as Syria dammed the river upstream. While the Yarmouk flows into the Jordan River, most of its water has been used in Syria and Jordan before reaching the river. Since the civil war broke out, hundreds of thousands of refugees have fled the area of southern Syria, many of whom were farmers. Most fled to refugee camps in Jordan. As a result, much more water now flows in the Yarmouk River and thus greater quantities of water are reaching the parts of the river that flow through Jordan, and later into Israel as well.

== Jordan basin ==
=== Banias ===
The Syria-Lebanon-Palestine boundary was a product of the post-World War I Anglo-French partition of Ottoman Syria. British forces had advanced to a position at Tel Hazor against Turkish troops in 1918 and wished to incorporate all the sources of the Jordan River within the British controlled Palestine. Due to the French inability to establish administrative control, the frontier between Syria and Palestine was fluid. Following the Paris Peace Conference of 1919, and the unratified and later annulled Treaty of Sèvres, stemming from the San Remo conference, the 1920 boundary extended the British controlled area to north of the Sykes Picot line, a straight line between the mid point of the Sea of Galilee and Nahariya. In 1920 the French managed to assert authority over the Arab nationalist movement and after the Battle of Maysalun, King Faisal was deposed. The international boundary between Palestine and Syria was finally agreed by Great Britain and France in 1923 in conjunction with the Treaty of Lausanne, after Britain had been given a League of Nations mandate for Palestine in 1922. Banyas (on the Quneitra/Tyre road) was within the French Mandate of Syria. The border was set 750 metres south of the spring.

In 1941, Australian forces occupied Banyas in the advance to the Litani during the Syria-Lebanon Campaign; Free French and Indian forces also invaded Syria in the Battle of Kissoué. Banias's fate in this period was left in a state of limbo since Syria had come under British military control. After the cessation of World War II hostilities, and at the time Syria was granted Independence (April 1946), the former mandate powers, France and Britain, bilaterally signed an agreement to pass control of Banias to the British mandate of Palestine. This was done against the expressed wishes of the Syrian government who declared France's signature to be invalid. While Syria maintained its claim on Banias in this period, it was administered from Jerusalem.

Following the 1948 Arab Israeli War, and the signing of the General Armistice Agreements in 1949, and DMZs included in the Armistice with Syria in July 1949, were "not to be interpreted as having any relation whatsoever to ultimate territorial arrangements." Israel claimed sovereignty over the Demilitarised zones (DMZs), on the basis that, "it was always part of the British Mandated Territory of Palestine." Moshe Dayan and Yosef Tekoah adopted a policy of Israeli control of the DMZ and water sources at the expense of Israel’s international image. The Banias spring remained under Syrian control, while the Banias River flowed through the contested Demilitarized Zone (DMZ) and into Israel.

=== Hasbani ===
The Hasbani River derives most of its discharge from two springs in Lebanon the Wazzani and the Haqzbieh, the latter being a group of springs on the uppermost Hasbani. The Hasbani runs for 25 miles (40 km) in Lebanon before crossing the border and joining with the Banias and Dan Rivers at a point in northern Israel, to form the River Jordan. For about four kilometres downstream of Ghajar, the Hasbani forms the border between Lebanon and northern Israel.

The Wazzani's and the Haqzbieh's combined discharge averages 138 million m³ per year. About 20% of the Hasbani flow emerges from the Wazzani Spring at Ghajar, close to the Lebanese Israeli border, about 3 kilometres west of the base of Mount Hermon. The contribution of the spring is very important, because it is the only continuous year-round flow in the river in either Lebanon or Israel.

Utilization of water resources in the area, including the Hasbani, has been a source of conflict and was one of the factors leading to the 1967 Six-Day War. The Hasbani was included in the Jordan Valley Unified Water Plan, proposed in 1955 by special US envoy Eric Johnston. Under the plan, Lebanon was allocated usage of 35 million cubic metres annually from it. The plan was rejected by the Arab League.

In 2001 the Lebanese government installed a small pumping station with a 10 cm bore to extract water to supply Ghajar village. In March 2002 Lebanon also diverted part of the Hasbani to supply Wazzani village. An action that Ariel Sharon said was a "casus belli" and could lead to war.

=== Dan ===
The Dan River is the largest tributary of the Jordan river, whose source is located at the base of Mount Hermon. Until the 1967 Six-Day War, the Dan River was the only source of the river Jordan wholly within Israeli territory. Its flow provides up to 238 million cubic metres of water annually to the Hulah Valley. In 1966 this was a cause of dispute between water planners and conservationists, with the latter prevailing after three years of court adjudication and appeals. The result was a conservation project of about 120 acres (0.49 km^{2}) at the source of the river called the Tel Dan Reserve.

=== Huleh marshes ===
In 1951 the tensions in the area were raised when, in the lake Huleh area (10 km from Banias), Israel initiated a project to drain the marsh land to bring 15,000 acres (61 km^{2}) into cultivation. The project caused a conflict of interests between the Israeli government and the Palestinian Arab villages in the area and drew Syrian complaints to the United Nations. On 30 March in a meeting chaired by David Ben-Gurion the Israeli government decided to assert Israeli sovereignty over the DMZs, consequently 800 inhabitants of the villages were forcibly evacuated from the DMZ. From 1951 Israel refused to attend the meetings of the Israel/Syria Mixed Armistice Commission. This refusal on the part of Israel not only constituted a flagrant violation of the General Armistice Agreement, but also contributed to an increase of tension in the area. The Security Council itself strongly condemned the attitude of Israel, in its resolution of 18 May 1951, as being "inconsistent with the objectives and intent of the Armistice Agreement"

Under UN auspices and with encouragement from the Eisenhower administration 9 meetings took place between 15 and 27 January 1953, to regularise administration of the 3 DMZs. At the eighth meeting Syria offered to adjust the armistice lines, and cede to Israel's 70% of the DMZ, in exchange for a return to the pre 1946 international border in the Jordan basin area, with Banias water resources returning uncontested to Syrian sovereignty. On 26 April, the Israeli cabinet met to consider the Syrian suggestions; with head of Israel’s Water Planning Authority, Simha Blass, in attendance. Blass noted that while the land to be ceded to Syria was not suitable for cultivation, the Syrian map did not suit Israel’s water development plan. Blass explained that the movement of the international boundary in the area of Banias would affect Israel’s water rights. The Israeli cabinet rejected the Syrian proposals but decided to continue the negotiations by making changes to the accord and placing conditions on the Syrian proposals. The Israeli conditions took into account Blass’s position over water rights and Syria rejected the Israeli counteroffer.

On 4 June 1953, Jordan and Syria concluded a bilateral plan to store surface water at Maqarin (completed in 2006 as Al-Wehda Dam), so as to be able to use the water resources of the Yarmouk river in the Yarmouk-Jordan valley plan, funded through the Technical Cooperation Agency of the United States of America, the UNRWA and Jordan.

Part of the Hula marshes were re-flooded in 1994 due to the negative effects from the original drainage plan.

== Regional projects ==
=== Israeli National Water Carrier project ===
In September 1953, Israel unilaterally started a water diversion project within the Jordan River basin to divert water from the Jordan River at Jacob's Ford (B'not Yacov) to help irrigate the coastal Sharon Plain and eventually the Negev desert. The diversion project consisted of a nine-mile (14 km) channel midway between the Huleh Marshes and Lake Galilee (Lake Tiberias) in the central DMZ to be rapidly constructed. Syria claimed that it would dry up 12,000 acres (49 km^{2}) of Syrian land. The UNTSO Chief of Staff Major General Vagn Bennike of Denmark noted that the project was denying water to two Palestinian water mills, was drying up Palestinian farm land and was a substantial military benefit to Israel against Syria. The US cut off aid to Israel. The Israeli response was to increase work. UN Security Council Resolution 100 "deemed it desirable" for Israel to suspend work started on 2 September "pending urgent examination of the question by the Council". Israel finally backed off by moving the intake out of the DMZ and for the next three years the US kept its economic sanctions by threatening to end aid channelled to Israel by the Foreign Operations Administration and insisting on tying the aid with Israel's behaviour. The Security Council ultimately rejected Syrian claims that the work was a violation of the Armistice Agreements and drainage works were resumed and the work was completed in 1957. This caused shelling from Syria and friction with the Eisenhower Administration; the diversion was moved to the southwest to Eshed Kinrot into the Israeli National Water Carrier project, designed by Tahal and constructed by Mekorot.

=== Jordan Valley Unified Water Plan ===
1955 US ambassador Eric Johnston negotiated the Jordan Valley Unified Water Plan. The plan was for the unified development of the Jordan Valley water resources based on an earlier plan commissioned by United Nations Relief and Works Agency for Palestine Refugees in the Near East (UNRWA). Modeled upon the Tennessee Valley Authority development plan, it was approved by technical water committees of all the regional riparian countries – Israel, Jordan, Lebanon and Syria. The plan was formally rejected by the Arab Higher Committee, but Nasser, the Egyptian president, assured the Americans that the Arabs would not exceed the water quotas prescribed by the Johnston plan. Jordan undertook to abide by their allocations under the plan. The plan was initially un-ratified by Israel, but after the US linked the Johnston plan to aid, also agreed to accept the allocation provisions.

Source	Lebanon	Syria	Jordan	Israel
Hasbani	35			
Banias		20		
Jordan (main stream)		22	100	**
Yarmouk		90	377*	25
Total	35	132	477	25

except for the above withdrawals
*the waters of the Yarmouk River will be available for the unconditional use of the Kingdom of the [sic] Jordan
** and the waters of the Jordan River will be for unconditional use of Israel.

The East Ghor canal formed part of a larger project – the Greater Yarmouk project – which envisioned two storage dams on the Yarmouk, and a West Ghor Canal, on the West Bank of the Jordan. These projects were never built, due to Israel's occupation of the West Bank of the Jordan River during the Six-Day War. After the Six-Day War, The PLO operated from bases within Jordan, and launched several attacks on Israeli settlements in the Jordan valley, including attacks on water facilities. Israel responded with raids in Jordan, in an attempt to force Hussein of Jordan of Jordan to rein in the PLO. The canal was the target of at least 4 of these raids, and was virtually knocked out of commission. The United states intervened to resolve the conflict, and the canal was repaired after Hussein undertook to stop PLO activity in the area.

=== Headwater Diversion Plan ===
First summit of Arab Heads of State was convened in Cairo between 13 and 17 January 1964, called by Nasser the Egyptian president, to discuss a common policy to confront Israel's national water carrier project which was nearing completion. The second Arab League summit conference voted on a plan which would have circumvent and frustrated it. The Arab and North African states chose to divert the Jordan headwaters rather than the use of direct military intervention. The heads of State of the Arab League considered two options:

1. The diversion of the Hasbani to the Litani combined with the diversion of the Banias to the Yarmouk,
2. The diversion of both the Hasbani and the Banias to the Yarmouk.

The Arab league plan selected was for the Hasbani and Banias waters to be diverted to Mukhaiba and stored. The scheme was only marginally feasible, was technically difficult and expensive. Arab political considerations were cited to justify the diversion scheme. In January 1964 an Arab League summit meeting convened in Cairo and decided:

The establishment of Israel is the basic threat that the Arab nation in its entirety has agreed to forestall. And Since the existence of Israel is a danger that threatens the Arab nation, the diversion of the Jordan waters by it multiplies the dangers to Arab existence. Accordingly, the Arab states have to prepare the plans necessary for dealing with the political, economic and social aspects, so that if necessary results are not achieved, collective Arab military preparations, when they are not completed, will constitute the ultimate practical means for the final liquidation of Israel.

After the 2nd Arab summit conference in Cairo of January 1964 (with the backing of all 13 Arab League members), Syria in a joint project with Lebanon and Jordan, started the development of the water resources of Banias for a canal along the slopes of the Golan toward the Yarmouk River. While Lebanon was to construct a canal form the Hasbani River to Banias and complete the scheme. The project was to divert 20 to 30 million cubic metres of water from the river Jordan tributaries to Syria and Jordan for the development of Syria and Jordan. The Syrian construction of the Banias to Yarmouk canal got under way in 1965. Once completed, the diversion of the flow would have transported the water into a dam at Mukhaiba for use by Jordan and Syria before the waters of the Banias Stream entered Israel and the Sea of Galilee. Lebanon also started a canal to divert the waters of the Hasbani, whose source is in Lebanon, into the Banias. The Hasbani and Banias diversion works would have had the effect of reducing the capacity of Israel's carrier by about 35% and Israel's overall water supply by about 11%. Israel declared that it would regard such diversion as an infringement of its sovereign rights. The Finance of the project was through contributions by Saudi Arabia and Egypt. This led to military intervention from Israel, first with tank and artillery fire and then, as the Syrians shifted the works further southwards, with airstrikes.
