= Environmental issues in Jordan =

Jordan experiences a myriad of environmental issues related to water supply and quality, land pollution, air pollution, rapid modernization, and natural hazards. Many of these issues are exacerbated by the rapid increase in population that Jordan has experienced since 1950, driven mainly by large waves of refugees. In the 1950s, Jordan had a population of 560,000 – this increased to 8.1 million by 2015. This has also contributed to a swift urbanization since the 1960s, at which point 49% of the population lived in rural regions. In 2021, the rural population of Jordan had reduced to 8%. The rural-to-urban migration is heavily influenced by issues of food and job stability, issues that have been thoroughly exacerbated by climate change.

Jordan has made attempts to counter climate change through policies such as the 2022–2050 National Climate Change Policy, the 2023–2040 National Water Strategy, or the Jordan Integrated Landscape Management Initiative (JILMI). Environmental activist movements to contribute to climate action efforts include the UNDP's Enhancing Women's Participation in the Solid Waste Management Sector Project, the Food and Agriculture Association Grant Program to enhance agrifood systems, or the work done by EcoPeace Middle East.

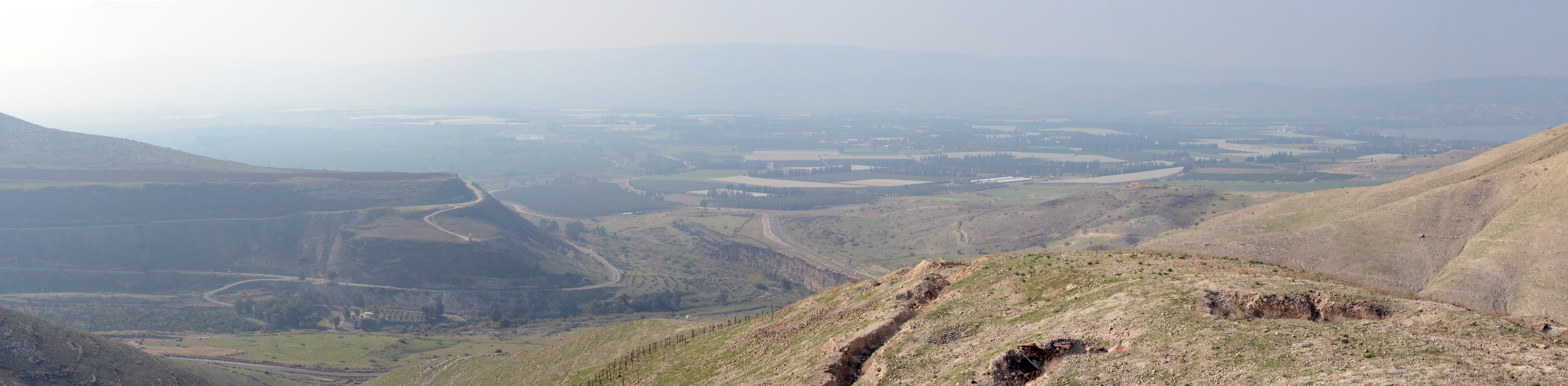
Jordan river valley

== Geography and climate ==
Jordan is situated geographically in West Asia, south of Syria, west of Iraq, northwest of Saudi Arabia, east of Israel and the Palestinian territory of the West Bank. Its territory covers about 89,544 km^{2}. (34,573 sq. mi.).

Jordan's terrain can be broken up into three tree regions: the Jordan Valley low-pitched groove, mountain heights, and Al-Badia desert plateau. The east and western high lands are largely composed of desert plateau.

Jordan's climate is a diverse fusion between Mediterranean basin and arid desert, characterized by hot and dry summers and dry and mild and humid winters. The dry tropical climate is found in the Jordan Valley, the Mediterranean and warm steppes climates in the mountain highlands, and a dry desert climate in eastern Badia.

== Climate change ==
Jordan contributes a mere 0.06 percent of global GHG emissions. However, the impacts of climate change are severe and likely to adversely affect the society and its economy. Climate change has a broad range of impacts in Jordan: Climate change reduces rainfall in Jordan, intensifies drought, and makes water scarcer in an already water-scarce region, and weather-related events are more likely to cause droughts, floods and landslides. Jordan faces severe droughts that further exacerbate Jordan's water scarcity concerns due to the combination of their desert climate and the global warming effects of climate change. These droughts are periodic: For instance, Jordan faced an intense drought period from 1998 to 2000 that severely harmed their economic, social, and environmental well-being.

== Population growth ==
Jordan has experienced a rapid, unsustainable population growth. Starting around the 1960s, the country began to experience rapid modernization, which in turn led to urbanization. Since then, the UN estimates that the population of cities in Jordan have doubled or tripled every 25–30 years. This increase in population, while largely in part is due to the high birthrate the country has experienced, is also largely driven by the Syrian refugee crisis. Jordan has taken in about 600,000 of the 2.5 million Syrian refugees. The country has the second highest ratio of citizens to refugees in the world, and the 5th largest refugee population. In 2015, it was estimated that, including those residing there before 2011, there were 1.4 million Syrians living in Jordan. High rates of refugees entering Jordan due to the Syrian Civil War have added further stress to Jordan's political, economic, and resource issues.

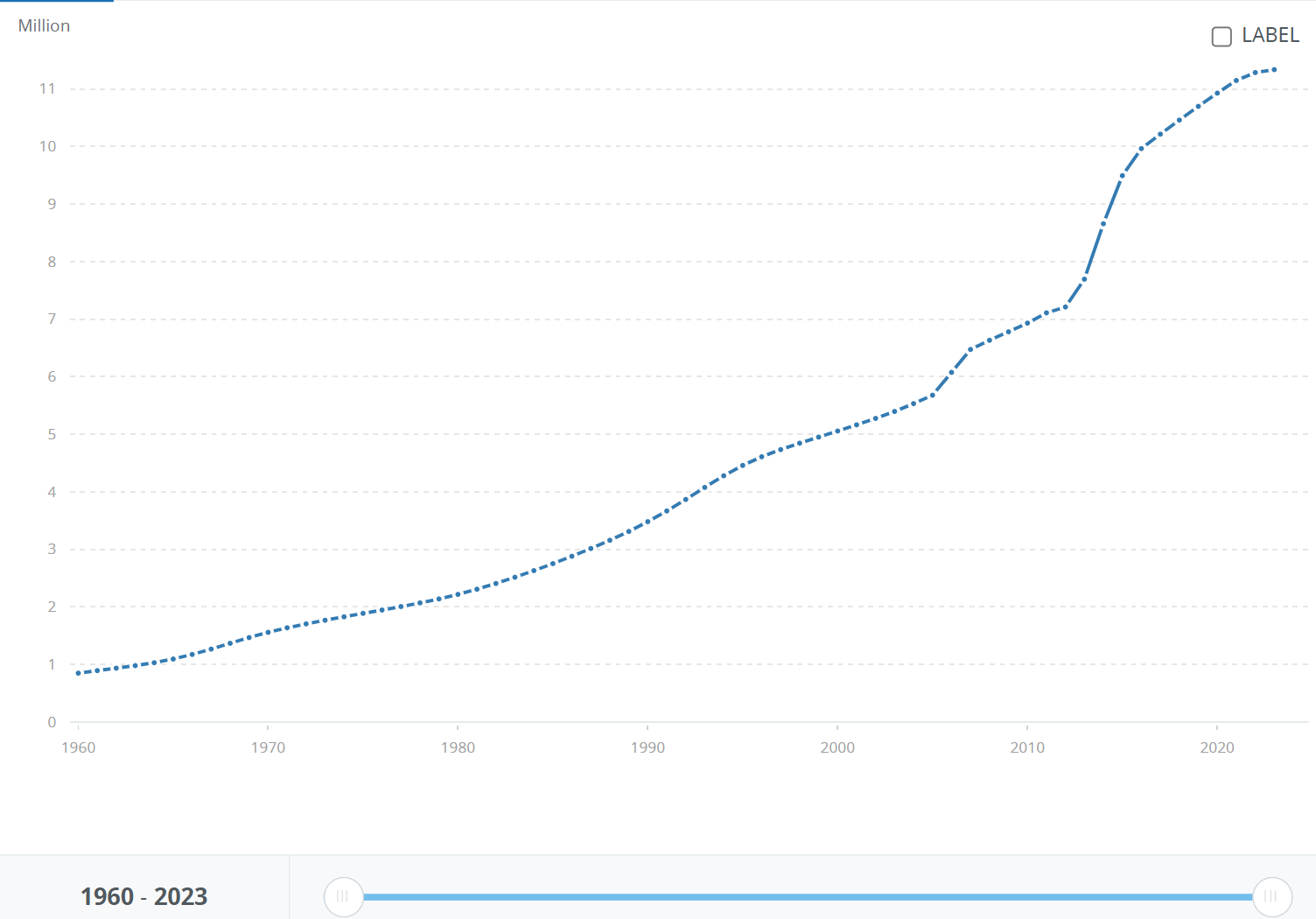
A graph of the population growth in Jordan from the years 1960 to 2023.

United Nations Development Program study states that, in 33 of 36 surveyed towns, solid waste management was the most affected service – respondents had conflicting views as to the principal cause and who was responsible. Many stated that this was the fault of the municipality and its infrastructure failing to provide adequate solid waste management services. However, a significant portion of respondents also directly blamed Syrian refugees. Solid waste volume increased by 340 tons daily due to the amount of Syrian refugees. This total fiscal cost was found to be around $58.4 million in 2013 and 2014 alone, stated by a report by the U.S. Agency for International Development (USAID).

84% of Syrian refugees live in host communities – the rest live in refugee camps. Refugees living in camps lack proper wastewater disposal infrastructure as well, resulting in their wastewater being dumped into bodies of water and contaminating the Jordan Valley water supply.

Syrian refugees find themselves concentrated in Jordan's most water-scarce regions – below both international and national standards for water and sanitation infrastructure. Jordan's attempt to meet the needs of its increased population resulted in the diversion of the Jordan River, due to lack of pipelines and filling points, decreasing its size drastically.

Having so many refugees, many of whom are concentrated in certain cities such as Amman, creates competition in their host communities. The refugee crisis has become highly politicized – public opinion on the Syrian refugees is largely negative. A study held by the International Labor Organization reported that 85% of Jordanian workers stated that Syrians should not be able to enter Jordan freely. 65% said that all Syrians should be occupying refugee camps. 96% said that they believed that Syrians were taking away their jobs.

Due to this negative public opinion, as well as a lack of confidence in foreign aid, has led the Jordanian government to restrict protected space for Syrians. Since 2014, Jordan has attempted to restrict Syrian refugee influx by closing border crossings and increasing the number of Syrians living in camps.

== Water ==
Jordan's largest environmental issue has been water quantity and quality. The country has been ranked the second-most water scarce country in the world, due to its per capita renewable water resources. International aid has prioritized most funding to fixing Jordan's water crisis, specifically in response to the Syrian Refugee Crisis.

=== Water quantity ===
Jordan is an arid region that receives very little precipitation, making it difficult to sustain domestic, agricultural, or industrial water supplies. Due to the effects of climate change, between 1980 and 2015, Jordan experienced decreasing rates of precipitation. On average, Jordan receives less than 100 mm per year of precipitation with some regions, such as the east desert, only receiving 50 mm/ year, with only 3% of Jordanian land receiving an annual precipitation of 300 mm/ year. This lack of rainfall results in low groundwater and surface water levels that limit the amount of water able to be used for domestic, agricultural or industrial purposes.

At the time of Jordan's independence in 1946, there was an estimated 3,600 cubic meters of freshwater per capita – this has decreased significantly due to population change and depletion of water supplies. With only 97 m3 of available water per capita per year, the water supply is significantly below the absolute water scarcity threshold of 500 m3 per capita per year. Before the Syrian Civil War, it was estimated that, by 2025, there would be only 90 m3 of freshwater per capita per year. The country's major surface water resources are the Jordan River and Yarmouk River, which are shared by its neighbors Israel and Syria.

The Jordan River is formed by three spring-fed rivers – the Hasbani River in southern Lebanon, the Dan River in northern Israel, and the Banias River in Syria. These all merge to create the upper Jordan Basin, which flows to Lake Tiberias. The river's main tributary, the Yarmouk, forms the border between Syria and Jordan. Due to the drastic shifts between wet years and dry years, the annual flow can vary from ~200 million cubic meters per year to ~1,000 MCM. There is an average of ~500 MCM.

37% of Jordan's water comes from surface water. This water, which is typically more easily replenishable, has been diminished. Due to reduced water supplies, Jordanian water companies have resorted to over-drawing water from renewable underground water resources. As a symptom of this, the water tables in areas surrounding these aquifers have been significantly lowered, causing further troubles for groundwater supply. Annually, aquifers are being depleted at twice the rate they recharge. This causes issues in the quality of the water drawn from the aquifers, as well as groundwater, and puts the aquifers at risk of pollution or collapsing.

Jordan also loses a large amount of water due to faulty, failing, or unmaintained infrastructure, and theft. International aid company Mercy Corps reports that, due to these problems, Jordan loses 50% of all water resources – at least 76 billion liters annually. This amount of water could provide for more than 1/3 of Jordan's population if managed correctly.

==== The Disi Water Conveyance Project ====
As an attempt to ameliorate water scarcity in urban areas, Jordan created the Disi Water Conveyance Project. This pipeline aimed to deliver water from the Disi-Mudawarra Aquifer in the south all the way to the capital city Amman in the north, providing water to Zarqa and Aqaba as well. This aquifer is shared with Saudi Arabia. The DWC was contracted to span 325 kilometers as a 1.1-billion-dollar project funded by Jordan, the European Investment Bank, France, and USAID. This was carried out by a Turkish company, Gama Electric. The project provided temporary jobs to individuals in the region, 60% of which were Jordanian. The DWC was put into full use in January 2014. However, the project is only a temporary solution – it has been predicted that Jordan will deplete its share of the aquifer within a few decades. While the project provided jobs to the poorer southern region, it failed to provide water to many other places in the region, notably Ma'an – where the extraction from the aquifer occurred. This was a large point of contention and caused tensions in the region.

Still, water supplies in Jordan currently fail to reach the demand created by its population. In the capital city Amman, daily water needs have risen to 90,000 cubic meters (CM) higher than the maximum available daily water levels. This creates a deficit of 35 million cubic meters (MCM) per year.

==== Transboundary relations ====
Achieving adequate water demand is made difficult for Jordan by their upstream neighbors, namely Israel and Syria, who overexploit their shared water resources through damming, diversions and pumping. This leaves Jordan with less than 10% of the flow of the upper Jordan and Yarmouk Rivers. In an attempt to improve their situation, Jordan, Israel, and the United Arab Emirates signed a declaration of intent in November 2021. This agreement would allow Jordan to sell energy from solar fields in exchange for desalinated water from Israel.

==== Current attempts ====
To improve water security, Jordan enacted the Jordan Water Sector Efficiency Project in 2023 which aims to reduce the use of non-revenue water through modernization of and general improvements of water supply infrastructure. The project also plans to increase energy efficiency, reduce energy cost, and include measures for water security and drought to better understand the negative effects of climate change and work to combat it.

=== Water quality ===
Jordan faces a myriad of issues related to water quality that began and have worsened since the 1950s. Jordan lacks arable land, due to the effects of climate change and its arid climate, resulting in Jordanian farmers using high rates of fertilizer to grow their crops. This fertilizer often runs off into prominent bodies of water, such as the Jordan River, resulting in contaminated water unfit for human consumption. Wastewater treatment plants also contribute to the pollution of the Jordan River and other water supplies. Increased demand for the provision of wastewater treatment services have led industrial and municipal plants to fall behind – existing infrastructure is not able to keep up.

For more see Water supply and sanitation in Jordan

== Air quality ==
Exhaust from engines, use of air conditioners, and other energy or fuel-intensive practices release harmful greenhouse gas emissions into the atmosphere. When released into Jordan's atmosphere, the greenhouse effect is amplified, negatively impacting Jordan's air quality. The primary industries that impact Jordan's climate, though it is not considered an industrial country, are textile and mining.

Air quality in Jordan is described as "moderately unsafe" due to the increased presence of particulate matter from the aforementioned industries and daily practices. Jordan has 5 times the amount of particulate matter than what is outlined in the World Health Organization's guidelines. Jordan's air pollution has been responsible for 20% of deaths related to strokes and heart disease—though air pollution is responsible for a myriad of health issues, these were most prominent in Jordan.

Jordan's air quality is heavily influenced by its economic growth. The impact of the economy on the environment is primarily measured using the Environmental Kuznets Curve which suggests that as an economy grows, pollution first increases but then decreases once the country reaches a certain level of economic development. While Jordan's economy continues to grow and pollution increases, the country has started to manage this more effectively, but air pollution remains a health concern, especially in urban areas.

== Waste management ==
In the 1960s, Jordan made attempts to improve their wastewater treatment systems with the opening of the Ain Ghazal wastewater sewage collection and treatment system located near the capital, Amman. Population increase that has overrun the system in combination with outdated and ineffective technology render this facility useless in water treatment, resulting in contamination of ground and surface water in the area.

Industrial practices, particularly regarding factories dealing with heavy metals, that don't take waste management into account can negatively impact the environment as well. High rates of soil pollution were found in central Jordan around a steel factory with high rates of metals such as iron, chromium and manganese found in topsoil. These metals are emitted during extraction of raw materials, drilling, and industrial processing. Dust from these activities is mostly found on topsoil located closest to these factories and can be harmful to human health.

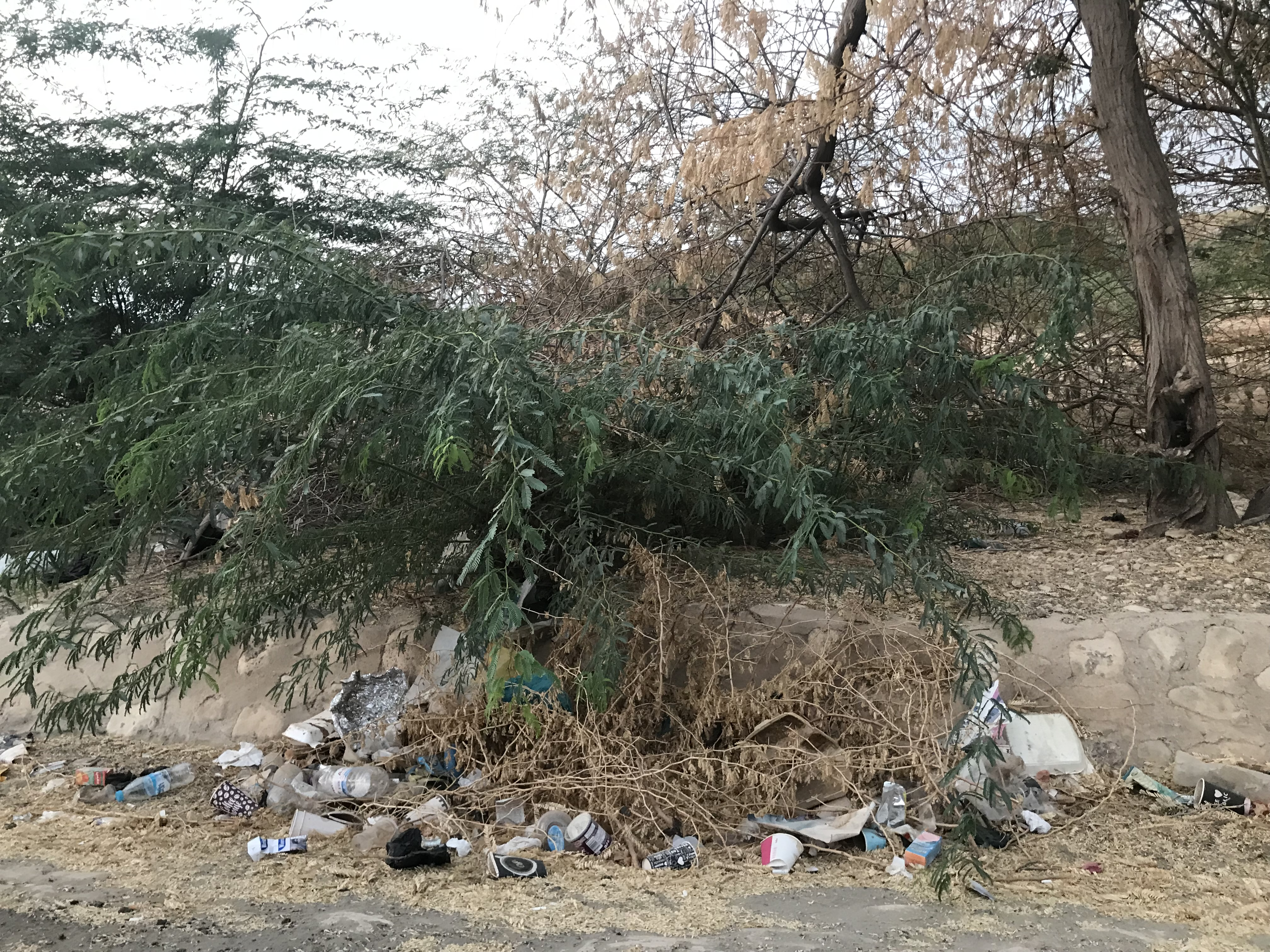
Accumulated litter along a road in Jordan

Solid waste management is another area for development in Jordan. Jordan has limited enforcement in waste management practices resulting in littering and deteriorating collection systems. The average municipal waste site in Jordan receives about 3700 tons per day, primarily generated from agricultural, municipal and industrial sources. Jordans lack of proper recycling and sorting practices gave rise to waste-pickers, who are usually people from poorer regions that look for waste to sell in order to alleviate financial hardship.

Jordan established a National SWM (Solid Waste Management) strategy (2015–2024) to create proper recycling and sorting systems. In the short term, Jordan plans to expand the MSW recycling schemes by 2024. As a long-term strategy, Jordan aims to construct mechanical and biological waste treatment facilities by 2034.

== Biodiversity ==
Human activity has been the main cause for decreasing biodiversity in Jordan. This includes agricultural practices that increase pesticide and fertilizer use that is harmful to local flora and fauna, burning of fossil fuels, over-hunting, urbanization and general pollution. These practices have contributed to the destruction of ecosystems and the harming of plants and animals. Lack of diversity in these ecosystems have decreased their resilience, making them more susceptible to extinction.

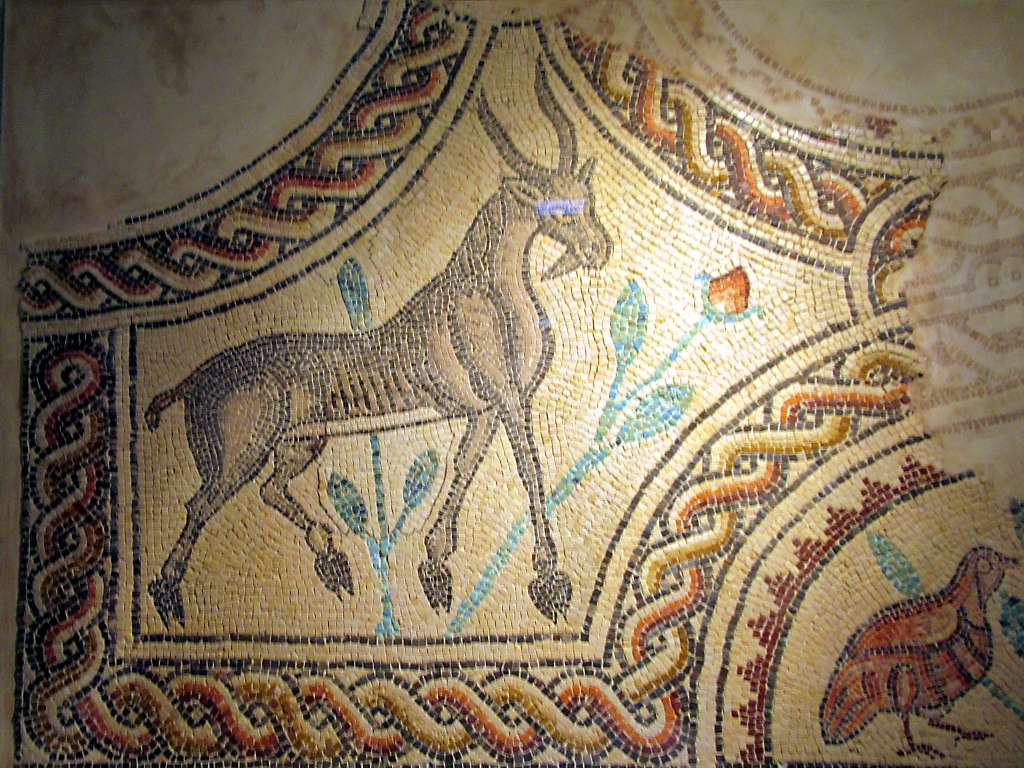
Historical depictions of gazelle, Jordan

=== Overhunting ===
Declines in large mammals such as Nubian ibex, striped hyaena, jackal and the Arabian wolf have been observed due to overhunting. Jordanian government organizations have been regulating hunting to protect endangered species and keep populations stable since 1934, but overhunting remains a major issue today.

Hunting is a difficult practice to regulate in Jordan. The government lack initiative to regulate these practices and enforce hunting laws. It is estimated that there are a greater number of unlicensed hunters than licensed hunters in Jordan, with an estimated 4,000 licensed hunters and 5,000–16,000 unlicensed hunters. There is also a general lack of understanding in Jordan about the importance of wild life conservation. From January 2015 – 2016, a study found that seven Facebook-based hunting groups in Jordan had recorded their killings of 4,707 native animals of 59 species. During this time period, at least 34 protected species were killed as well.

=== Overgrazing ===
Overgrazing results in soil erosion which can lead to landslides, most commonly seen in the highlands of Jordan, that destroy swaths of vegetation and land that local fauna use for food and shelter. This in turn, negatively effects the fauna populations in Jordan as well as plant biodiversity. Furthermore, overgrazing results in desertification which increases the particulate matter in the air that is harmful to both humans and wildlife.

== Policies ==
=== Jordan's 2022–2050 National Climate Change Policy ===
Jordan's climate change policy outlines its goals to reach carbon neutrality by 2050. This policy is in alignment with Jordan's Economic Modernization Vision and the United Nations Framework Convention on Climate Change. This policy has several objectives. Firstly, a reduction of greenhouse gas emissions and promotion of a low carbon economy. Secondly, increasing climate resilience and decreasing Jordan's vulnerability to climate change. Thirdly, promoting sustainable development and improving quality of life through the creation of employment and improving food, water, and energy security.

=== 2023–2040 National Water Strategy ===
The Ministry of Water and Irrigation aims to improve water availability and quality through the preservation of ground and surface water sources and to mitigate water usage to be less water intensive. This is planned to be done by improving existing wastewater treatment facilities through technological development and to begin incorporating this wastewater into agriculture and decreasing water use in agriculture. In 2022, the ministry committed to decreasing water loss by 25% by 2040.

The ministry plans to develop the technology used in the 33 existing wastewater facilities in Jordan by increasing treatment abilities of toxic and inorganic matter and incorporating a larger portion of this treated water into agriculture. Due to water shortages, it is critical that a greater portion of Jordan's water be recycled.

In the agricultural sector, the ministry aims to reduce water usage for irrigation, considering Jordanian farmers use five times the amount of water necessary for irrigation.

=== Jordan Integrated Landscape Management Initiative (JILMI) ===
This project aims to mitigate the effects of climate change in Jordan through an integrated approach that incorporates land and water usage to improve biodiversity along with public and ecosystem health. This project particularly focuses on water scarcity in the northern Jordan Valley by targeting three small-scale farming communities—the Yarmouk, Amman Zarqa, and Jordan Rift Valley Basins. The initiative plans to increase Jordan's annual water supply by 9 million cubic meters and increase water security and climate resilience for 750,000 residents of the Jordan Valley. Local people will be trained on sustainable climate resistant practices such as vegetable gardening, beekeeping, and water-efficient agricultural practices. A floating solar power system on the King Abdellah Canal which simultaneously plans to reduce water evaporation and produce sustainable energy.

== Environmental activism ==
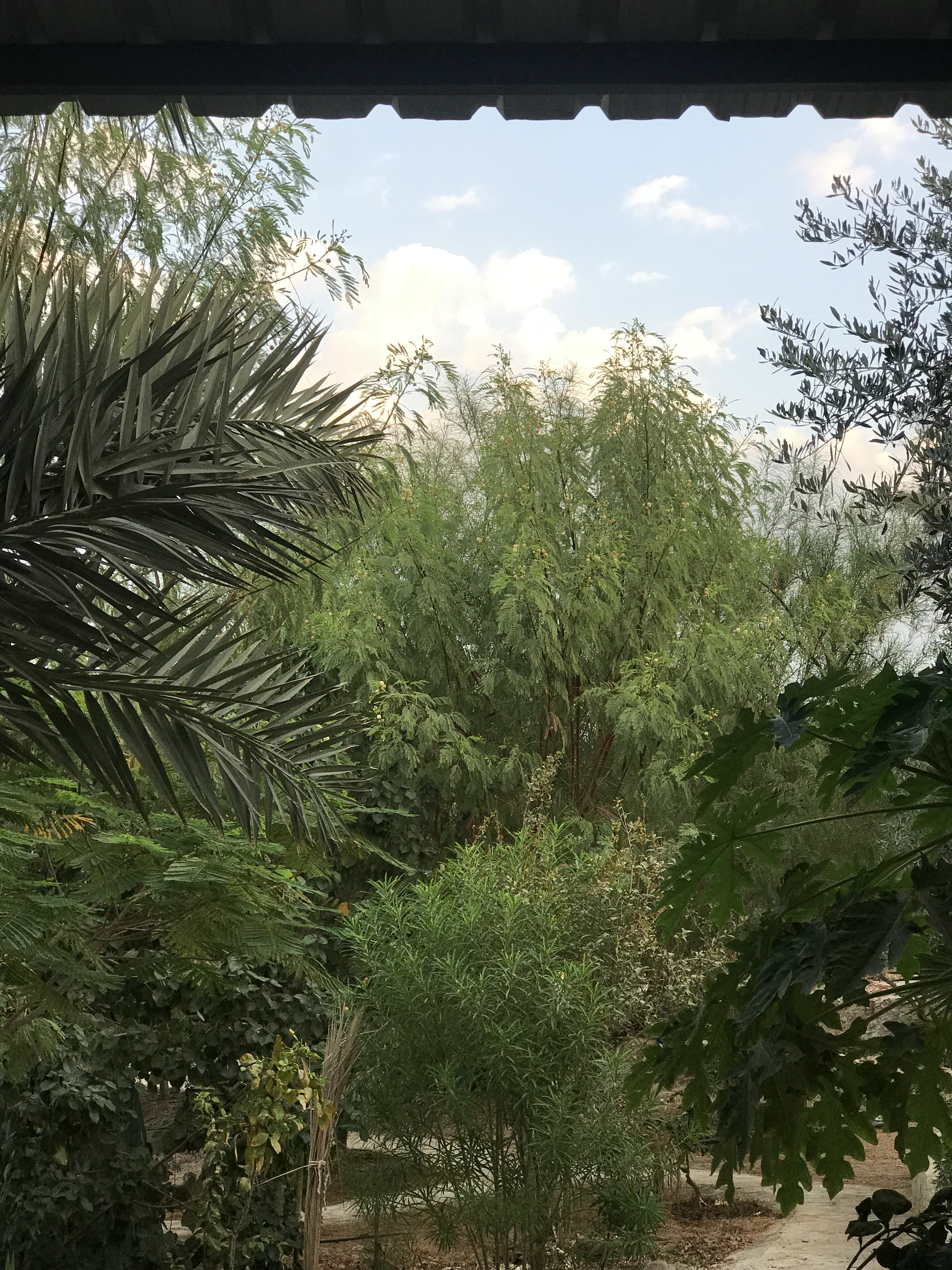
Greening the Desert II oasification project in Balqa region near the Dead Sea

=== UNDP's Enhancing Women's Participation in the Solid Waste Management Sector Project ===
This initiative is based on northern Jordan and focuses on promoting female empowerment and sustainability. Women are responsible for a variety of tasks including sorting and collecting solid waste from landfills which decreases the negative effects of pollution, marketing, and involvement in organic fertilizer production. The use of organic fertilizer improves soil fertility and aids in the recycling of organic materials by decreasing greenhouse gas emissions as waste decomposes.

This project has boosted the local economy by providing jobs for women, affordable organic fertilizer for farmers, and has decreased waste management costs for local authorities.

=== Food and Agriculture Association (FAO) Grant Program 'Transformation to a more efficient, inclusive, resilient, and sustainable agrifood systems' ===
Funded by the Norwegian government, this FAO grant equips people with knowledge regarding sustainable food production practices. Once they put these practices into action through cultivation, micro financing from the FAO gives them the opportunity to sell their produce on the market. This project provides people with financial independence, self-sustaining food security, while simultaneously improving the local land. This program has created 300 jobs already for local people.

=== EcoPeace Middle East ===
EcoPeace Middle East is an organization focused on mobilizing local people to participate in climate related educational and collaborative efforts and the enacting progressive climate legislation.

In 2019, EcoPeace launched a youth leadership program for people aged 20–35 years old to practice their professional, diplomatic, and negotiation skills through dialog with other Israeli, Palestinian and Jordanian young professionals. These discussions are mainly based on water issues and provide a platform for young people to establish networks and foster an environment for social and political change.

== See also ==
- Jordan
- Climate change in Jordan
- Water supply and sanitation in Jordan
- Geography of Jordan
- King Abdullah Canal
