= Ayun Stream =

Tributary of the Jordan River in Israel

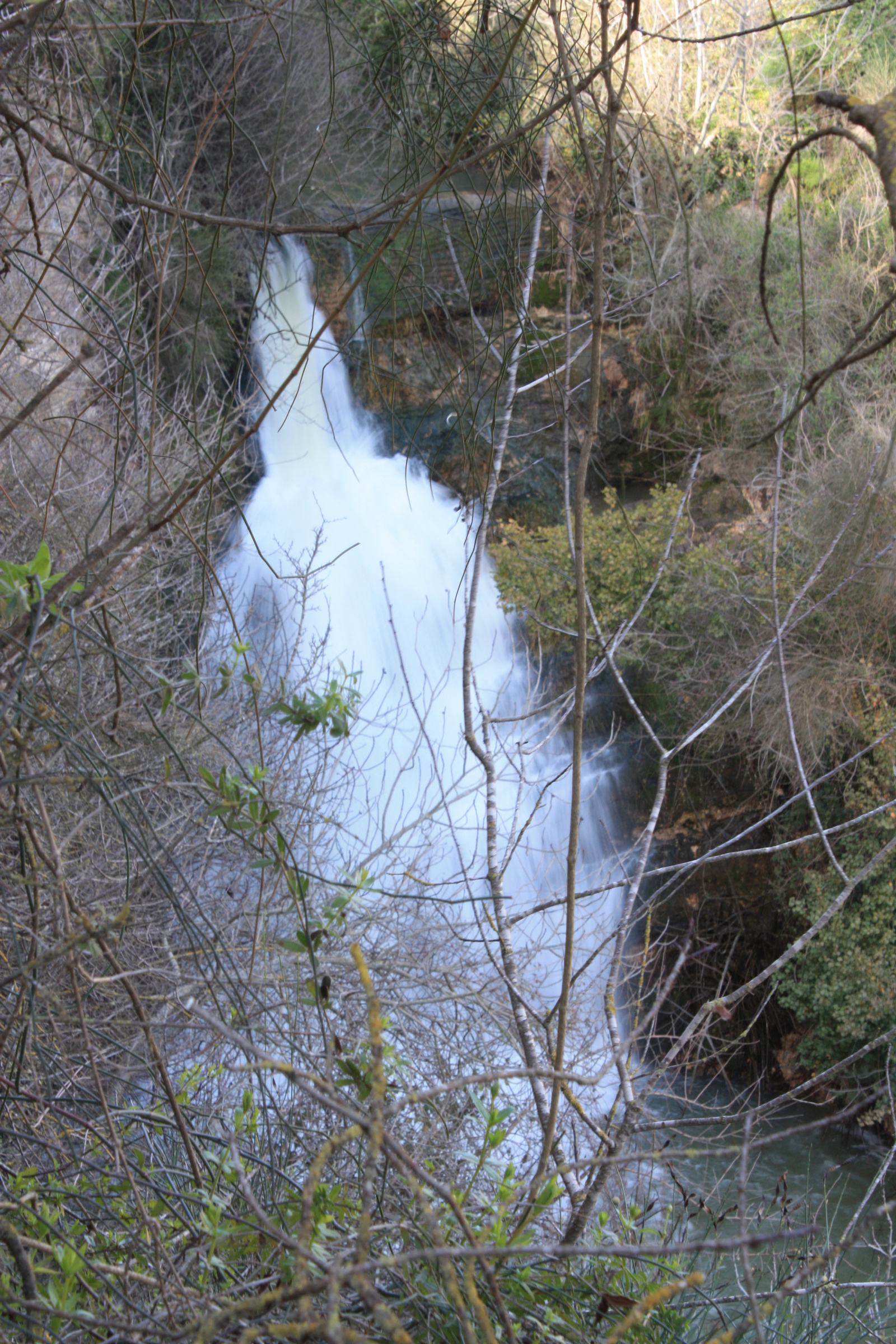
- Iyyon waterfall
- Native name: Nahal Ayun (Hebrew); Nahr Bareighit (Arabic)

Physical characteristics
- Source: 'Ain ed Derdarah
- Mouth: enters the Hasbani River
  - coordinates: 33°13′26″N 35°36′51″E

Ayun Stream (Hebrew: נחל עיון, romanized Nahal Ayun, lit. Ayun Stream), sometimes spelled Nahal Iyyon, in Arabic: براغيث Bureighit, or in full Nahr Bareighit, is a perennial stream and a tributary of the Jordan River. The stream originates from two springs in the Marjayoun (Merj 'Ayun) valley in southern Lebanon, runs southward for seven kilometers through various irrigation ditches, then flows into Israel near Metulla, where it continues through the Hula Valley in the Galilee Panhandle until emptying in the Hasbani River just before it reaches the Jordan River.

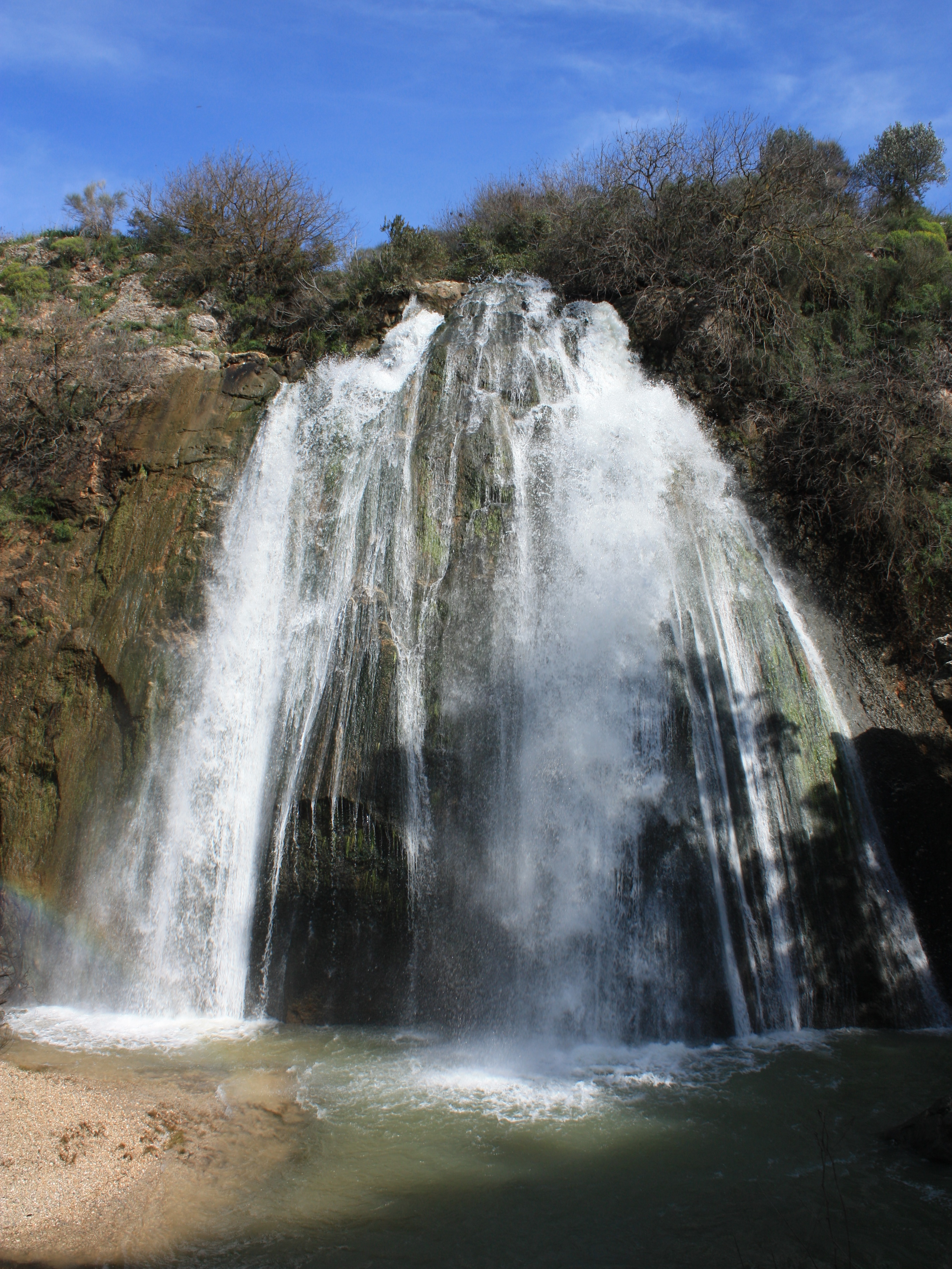
Tahana waterfall

== Course of the stream ==
The Nahal Ayun originates near Marj Ayun in South Lebanon, flowing about 7 kilometres (4.3 mi) through the Ayun Valley, branching into numerous irrigation channels until it enters Israel near Metula. From there, the stream flows in a canyon channel descending from about 500 metres (1,600 ft) above sea level to about 300 metres (980 ft) south of Tel Abel Beit Maacah, then gradually through the Hula Valley.

The significant elevation differences have formed several waterfalls along the channel, including those within the Ayun Nature Reserve. Within this reserve are four notable waterfalls (from north to south): Ayun Waterfall; the Grinding Mill Waterfal; the Ashd Waterfall; and the Furnace (Tannur) Waterfall.

Within the Hula Valley, Nahal Ayun flows westward into the Hula Basin. After the draining of the Hula, the stream was diverted into the drainage system of the valley, with little remaining of its original course. One of the drainage systems directs some of the waters of Nahal Ayun towards the Jordan River near its three sources, which is why some consider it part of the Jordan River sources.

In the watershed of Nahal Ayun, an average of about 900 millimetres (35 in) of rain falls annually, causing significant variations in water flow between seasons. In winter, there is often intense flooding, while in summer, flow decreases significantly as it relies mainly on springs. Most of the water is used for irrigation within Lebanon, with only a small amount reaching Israel. Even in Israel, it primarily serves agricultural irrigation near Metula, resulting in minimal flow in its lower part during the summer. To address this, the Israel Nature and Parks Authority has been artificially diverting water since 2009 from boreholes in the Dan River area during the summer months.

== Names ==
=== Arabic ===
The Arabic name is most often transliterated as "Dardara" for the upper course and "Bareighit" or "Bureighith" for the lower one. The "Memoirs of the Survey of Western Palestine", published in 1881 in connection with the maps resulting from the 1870s Survey, use a slightly different spelling; the "very large spring" of a 'Ain ed Derdarah, lit. "the spring of the derdârah (elm) tree", from the village of El Khiam, is mentioned to create a "strong stream", that once it's enhanced by the waters of 'Ain Hosh (Hosh Spring) becomes Nahr Bareighit, lit. "the river of fleas". However, the Survey map actually uses another name altogether for the upper course, Wadi el Kharrar, "the valley of the murmuring water". This seems to be either a typo, or a lesser-used name, since the index list of the Memoirs is sending under "Wadi el Kharrar", to page 36, where the name Wadi el Kharrar doesn't appear at all; instead, on that page there is an explanation regarding names omitted from the map due to lack of space - but this doesn't apply either, since the name "Wadi Kharrar" appears very well visible on Sheet 2 / Qb across the Merj 'Ayun plain.

== Nature reserve ==
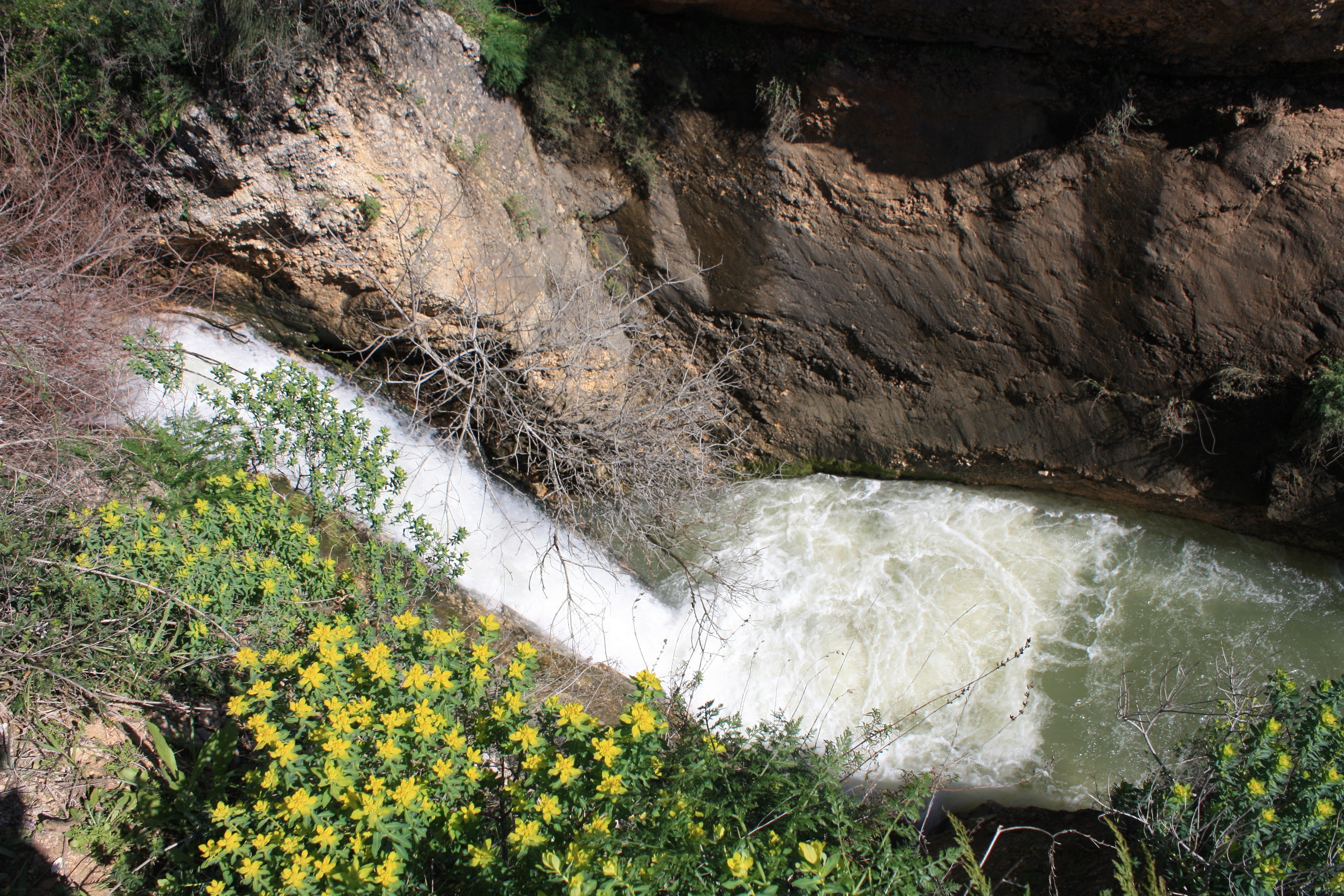
Eshed Fall

During the rainy winter months the water-flow is strongest. During the summer months, water is diverted for crop irrigation close to the stream's springs. Differences in elevation form waterfalls along the stream. These falls were declared a nature reserve, and include:

- Tahana ("flourmill") waterfall, 21 m high
- Eshed ("cascades") waterfall, with two steps, 9.5 m the upper fall and 5 m the bottom fall (eshed as a Hebrew root means "to pour", which gave rise to the meaning of "waterfall"; also "bottom, slope, foundation, lower part".
- Ayun/Iyyon waterfall, 9.2 m high
- Tan(n)ur waterfall, 30 m high, named either after the tannur oven, or after the Lebanese tanur skirt

== Flora and fauna ==
Tree types in the reserve include terebinths (Pistacia terebinthus), buckthorns (Rhamnus lycioides), and maples (Acer obtusifolium). Other growth includes Spanish broom, rubus, cyclamen (Cyclamen persicum), and anemones.

Grey wagtails can be found during the winter months, as well as white-throated kingfishers and common kestrels.

== See also ==
- List of rivers of Israel
- Tourism in Israel
- Wildlife in Israel
