= Wazzani =

Lebanese village

Al-Wazzani الوزاني
- Municipality
- Location within Lebanon
- Coordinates: 33°16′24.4″N 35°36′48.8″E
- Country: Lebanon
- Governorate: Nabatieh Governorate
- District: Marjayoun District
- Time zone: UTC+2 (EET)
  - Summer (DST): UTC+3 (EEST)

Al-Wazzani (Arabic: الوزاني, romanized: al-Wazānī, also known as Al-Ouazzani, Arab al-Louaizeh or Aarab El Louaizeh), is a municipality in the Marjayoun District of the Nabatieh Governorate, on the banks of the Hasbani River. The village is located about 1 km from the Wazzani Spring, a major source of the Hasbani, which is a tributary of the Jordan River. The village has about 200 residents.

== History ==
=== Modern era ===
In 2001 the Lebanese government installed a small pumping station with a 10 cm bore near the village, to supply water to the village as well the nearby villages al-Teiba and Ghajar. In March 2002 Lebanon also diverted part of the Hasbani to supply Wazzani village, an action that then Prime Minister of Israel, Ariel Sharon, said was a "casus belli" and could lead to war. The pumping station was destroyed during the 2006 Lebanon War.

In 2024, a Lebanese soldier was killed by an Israeli drone strike in the village, a day prior to the Israeli invasion of Lebanon.

== Demographics ==
In 2014 Muslims made up 100% of registered voters in Al-Wazzani. 87.86% of the voters were Sunni Muslims and 12.14% Shiite Muslims.
