= Banias River =

River

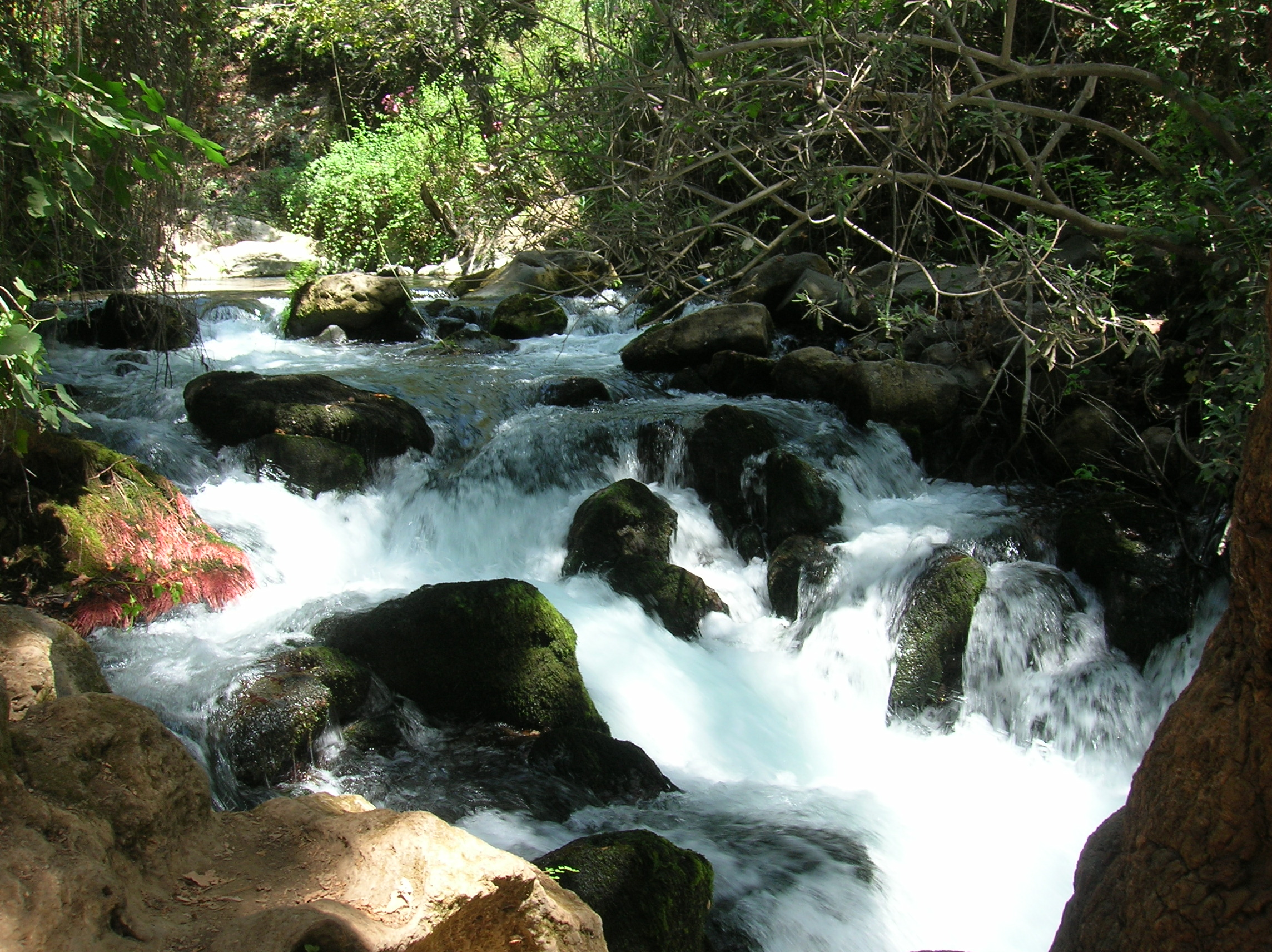

Physical characteristics
- Source
  - location: Banias spring
  - coordinates: 33°14′55″N 35°41′40″E
- Mouth
  - location: Dan River
  - coordinates: 33°11′45″N 35°37′32″E
- Length: 9 km

Basin features
- River system: Upper Catchment of the Jordan River
- Tributaries
  - left: Sa'ar Stream; Pera' Stream
  - right: Guvta Stream; Sion Stream

The Banias (Arabic: نهر بانياس, romanized: Nahr Baniyas; Hebrew: נחל חרמון, romanized: Nahal Hermon) is a river flowing from the Golan Heights to Israel. It is the easternmost of the three main northern tributaries of the Jordan River; together with the Dan River and the Hasbani River, it forms the Jordan River's upper catchment (UCJR). Israel has included the stream in the Hermon nature reserve.

== Course and streamflow ==
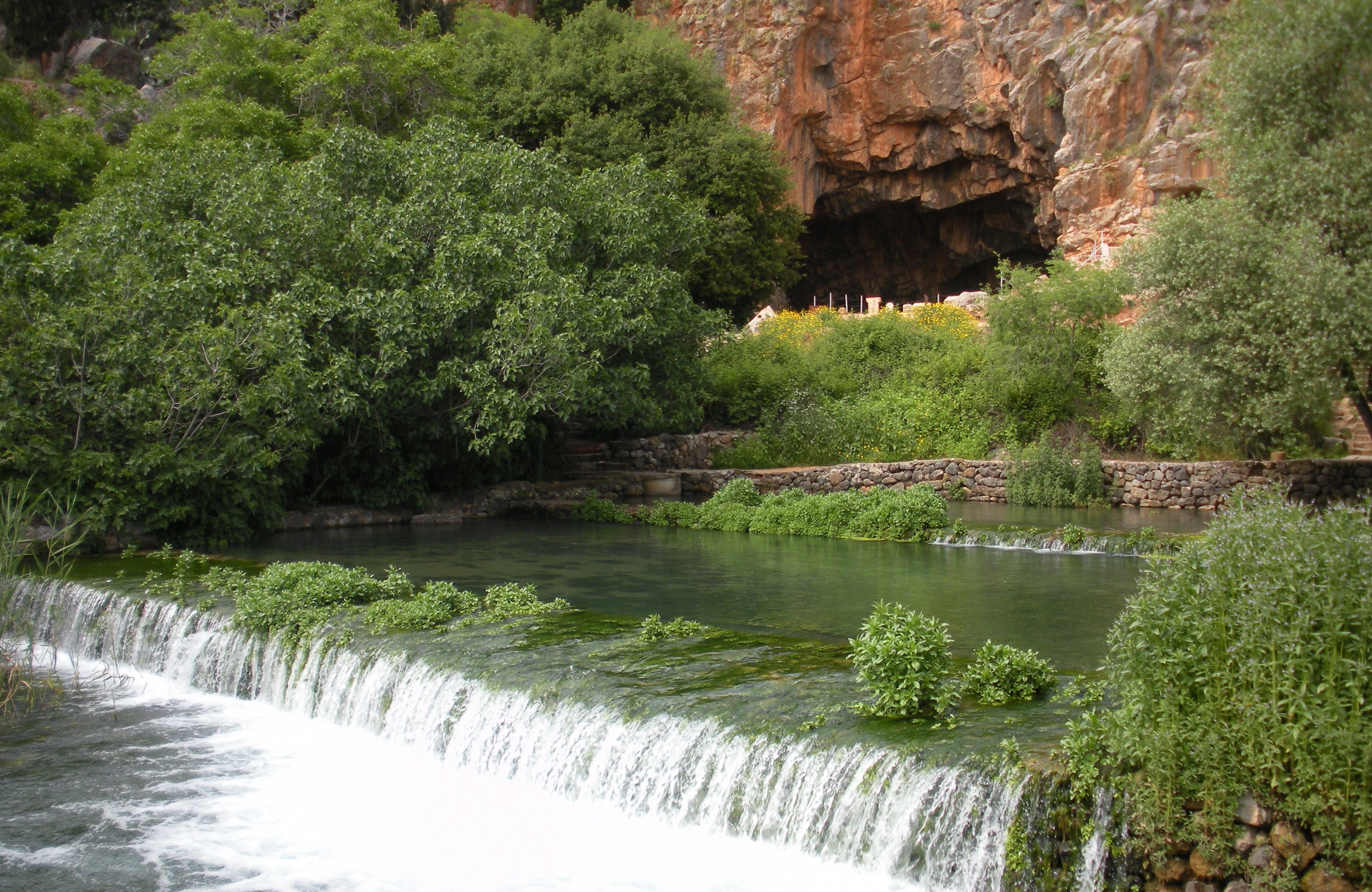
The Banias spring and cave of Pan

The main source of the Banias River is the Banias spring, located at the southern base of the Hermon mountain range and contributing a discharge of 67·million m^{3} annually. From there the stream flows south for nine kilometers before draining into the Dan River just north of Sde Nehemia. Along the way, it drains the Guvta Stream (right), the Sa'ar Stream (left), the Pera' Stream (left), and the Sion (Ar.: el-'Asl) Stream (right), with a total drainage area of 158 km^{2}. The total annual streamflow of the river comes to 106 million m^{3}.

== Flora and fauna ==
The banks of the river abound in willow trees, oriental planes, silver-leaf poplars, Tabor oaks, Palestine oaks, Mt. Atlas mastics, terebinths, carobs, ferns, giant canes, and various vines.

The stream is home to a variety of fluvial fish, including longhead barbel, large-scale barbel, Damascus barbel, and tilapia. Living and roaming around the stream or in it are wild boars, Syrian rock hyrax, swamp cats, nutria, and Indian porcupines.

Birds that frequent the vicinity of the stream include rock doves and Western rock nuthatch.

== History ==
The Newcombe-Paulet Agreement of 1923, endorsed later by the League of Nations, delineated the international boundary between the British Mandate and the French Mandate, effectively separating Palestine from Syria and Lebanon. According to the agreement, the stream itself would remain within British Mandate territory, while the village and springs would fall under French Mandate control (therefor, part of Syria). Following the armistice agreements after the 1948 Arab–Israeli War, areas west of the international boundary line captured by Syria were designated as demilitarized zones. In practice, Syria took control of the northern part of the Banias Ridge in the early 1950s, leaving only the southern part of the stream under Israeli jurisdiction.

In 1964, Syria mobilized heavy engineering equipment in the area and initiated a project to divert the stream eastward, aiming to prevent its waters from reaching Israel, which contravened international law. Israel strongly opposed this action, sparking an intense conflict over control of the Jordan River's water resources. A pivotal moment in this conflict was the IDF's operation on August 12, 1965, when they successfully destroyed the diversion equipment in a battle involving artillery and tanks. Despite Syrian efforts, they managed to dig only a small portion of the diversion before the area was later captured by Israel during the Six-Day War. During that conflict, a Syrian tank battalion ventured into the area, and during ensuing engagements, one of the tanks ended up submerged in the streambed, where it remained.
