= Jordan River =

River that flows to the Dead Sea

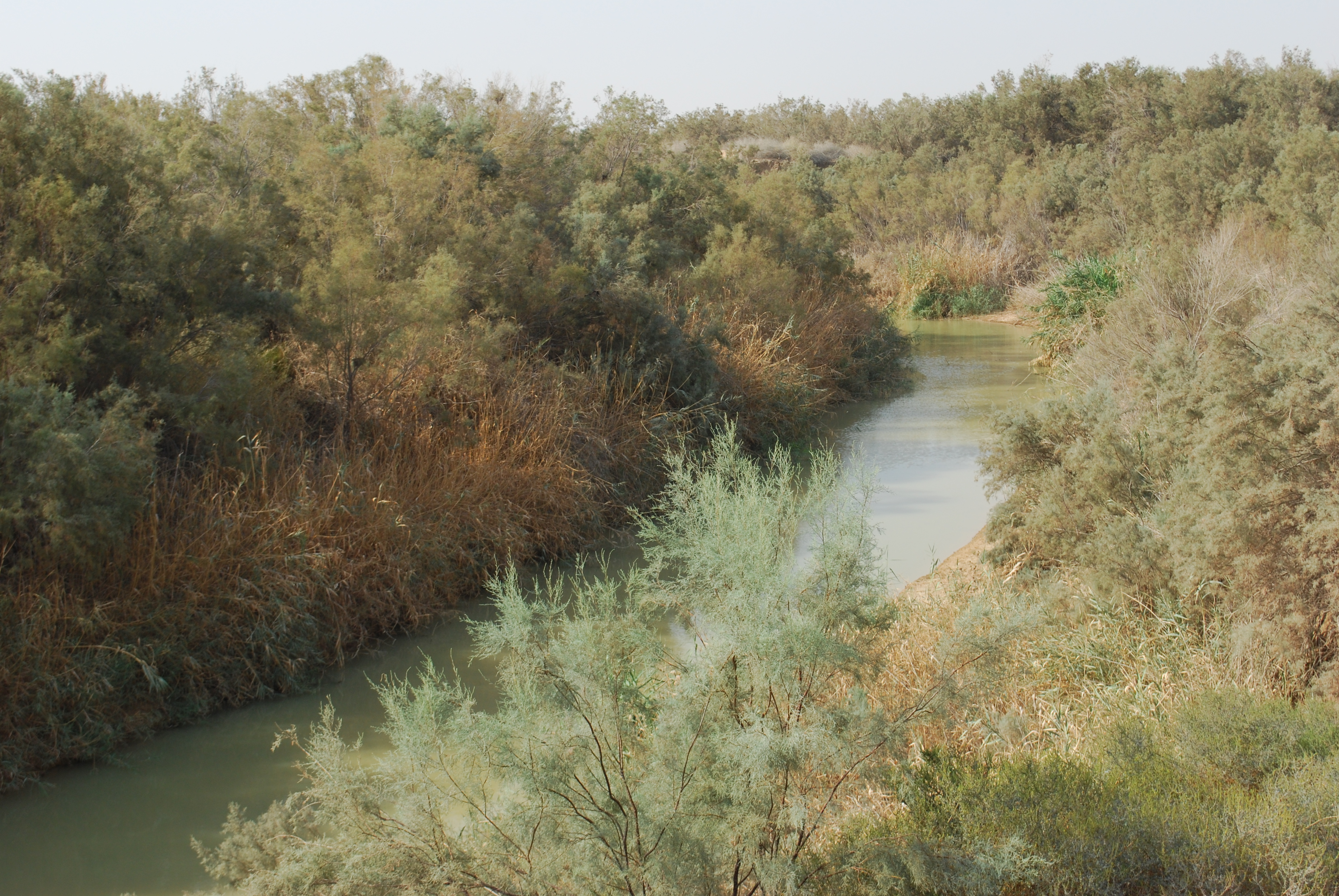
- Jordan River

- The Jordan River runs along the border between Jordan, the Palestinian West Bank, Israel and southwestern Syria.
- Native name: نهر الأردن (Arabic); Nahr al-Urdun (Arabic); נהר הירדן (Hebrew); Nehar ha-Yarden (Hebrew); نهر الشريعة (Arabic); Al Sharieat (Arabic); ܢܗܪܐ ܕܝܘܪܕܢܢ (Classical Syriac)

Location
- Country: Jordan, Israel, Syria, Israeli-occupied Palestinian territory of West Bank
- Region: West Asia, Eastern Mediterranean litoral

Physical characteristics
- Source: Confluence of Hasbani River and Dan River
  - location: Sde Nehemia kibbutz in northern Israel
  - coordinates: 33°11′15″N 35°37′10″E
  - elevation: 70 m (230 ft)
- Mouth: Dead Sea
  - elevation: −416 m (−1,365 ft)
- Length: 251 km (156 mi)
- Discharge
  - location: Dead Sea, Jordan Rift Valley

Basin features
- Tributaries
  - left: Banias River, Dan River, Yarmouk River, Zarqa River
  - right: Hasbani or Snir River, Iyyon Stream

The Jordan River or River Jordan (Arabic: نَهْر الْأُرْدُنّ, Nahr al-ʾUrdunn; Hebrew: נְהַר הַיַּרְדֵּן, Nəhar hayYardēn), also known as Nahr Al-Sharieat (Arabic: نهر الشريعة), is a 251-kilometre-long (156 mi) endorheic river in the Levant that flows roughly north to south through the Sea of Galilee and drains to the Dead Sea. The river passes by or through Jordan, Syria, Israel, and Palestine.

Jordan and the Israeli-occupied Golan Heights border the river to the east, while Israel and the Israeli-occupied West Bank lie to its west. Both Jordan and the West Bank derive their names in relation to the river. The river holds major significance in Islam, Judaism, and Christianity. According to the Bible, the Israelites crossed it into the Promised Land and Jesus of Nazareth was baptized by John the Baptist in it. Some of the companions of Muhammad are thought to have been buried along its banks.

== Etymology ==
There are several hypotheses for the origin of most of the river's names in modern languages (e.g., Jordan, Yarden, Urdunn). One is that it comes from the Semitic Yardōn (“flow down”) from the root ירד (y-r-d, “to descend”), reflecting the river's declivity, possibly appearing also in other river names in the region such as Yarkon and Yarmouk. It may alternatively be related to the Egyptian loanword yǝʾor (“big river”, the Nile). According to this hypothesis, "Den" might be linked to the Akkadian word dannum for "powerful". Cognates of the word are found in Aramaic, Hebrew, Mandaic, and other Semitic languages. The first recorded use of the name appears as Yārdon in Anastasi I, an ancient Egyptian papyrus that probably dates to the time of Rameses II (c. 1303 BC – 1213 BC). Early Arab chronicles referred to the river as Al-Urdunn.

In Mandaic, the etymologically related term Yardena (Classical Mandaic: ࡉࡀࡓࡃࡍࡀ) can refer not only to the Jordan River, but also any other body of flowing water that can be used for Mandaean baptismal rituals (masbuta).

After the Crusades, the Arabic name Nahr Al Sharieat (Arabic: نهر الشريعة), literally "the watering place" began to be used, and was recorded by medieval geographers such as Abu'l-Fida and Al-Dimashqi. The name was shown in various forms on most notable 19th century maps of the region and is described by Edward Robinson in his Biblical Researches in Palestine. Although historical sources do not appear to make this distinction, it is described in some modern sources as the name for the part of the river before it flows into the Sea of Galilee.

== Geography ==
=== Sources ===
The Dan and Hasbani rivers merge near the kibbutz Sde Nehemia in northern Israel and become the Jordan River. The Hasbani (Arabic: الحاصباني Hasbani, Hebrew: either שניר Snir or Hatzbani) is a stream which flows from the north-western foot of Mount Hermon in Lebanon, with a flow of 118 million m^{3} annually. The Iyyon (Hebrew: עיון Iyyon, Arabic name: Ajoun stream, but دردره Dardara for the uppermost course and براغيث Bareighith or Beregeith for the rest of its course) is a stream which flows from Merj 'Ayun area in southern Lebanon into the Hasbani.

The Dan (Arabic: اللدان Leddan or Liddan, Hebrew: דן Dan) is the largest among the Jordan's upper course tributaries with c. 240-252 million cubic metres per year. The Banias (Arabic: بانياس Banias, Hebrew: either Banias or חרמון Hermon) is a stream arising from a spring at Banias at the foot of Mount Hermon, with a flow of 106 million m^{3} annually. It flows into the Dan along with the Nahal Sion or Nahal Assal (Hebrew) / Wadi el-'Asl or Assal (Arabic).

=== Upper course (Hula Valley) ===
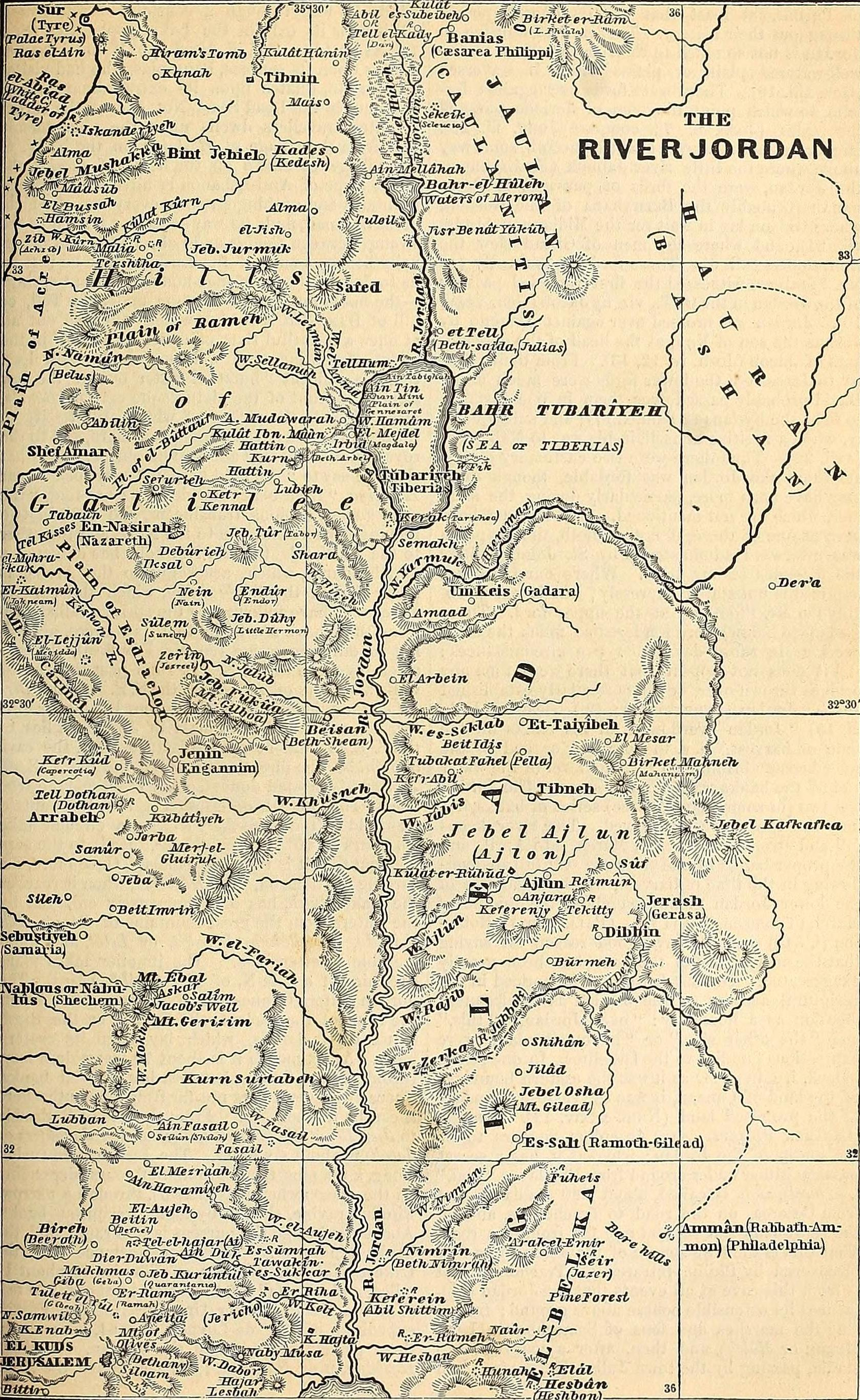
1871 map of the Jordan River. Note in particular Lake Hula, which was later drained.

The Jordan River has an upper course from its sources to the Sea of Galilee (via the Bethsaida Valley) and a lower course south of the Sea of Galilee down to the Dead Sea. In traditional terminology, the upper course (or most of it) is commonly referred to as passing through the "Hula Valley", as opposed to "Upper Jordan Valley"; the Sea of Galilee through which the river passes is a separate entity, and the term Jordan Valley is reserved for the lower course.

Over its upper course (fed by the Hasbani River, Banias River, Dan River, and the Iyyon Stream), the river drops rapidly in a 75-kilometre (47 mi) run to the once large and swampy Lake Hula, which is slightly above sea level. Exiting the now much-diminished lake, it goes through an even steeper drop over the 25 kilometres (16 mi) down to the Sea of Galilee, which it enters at its northern end. The Jordan deposits much of the silt it is carrying within the lake, which it leaves again near its southern tip at Degania Dam.

Its section north of the Sea of Galilee is within the boundaries of Israel and forms the western boundary of the Golan Heights. South of the lake, it forms the border between the Kingdom of Jordan (to the east), and Israel (to the west).

=== Lower course ===
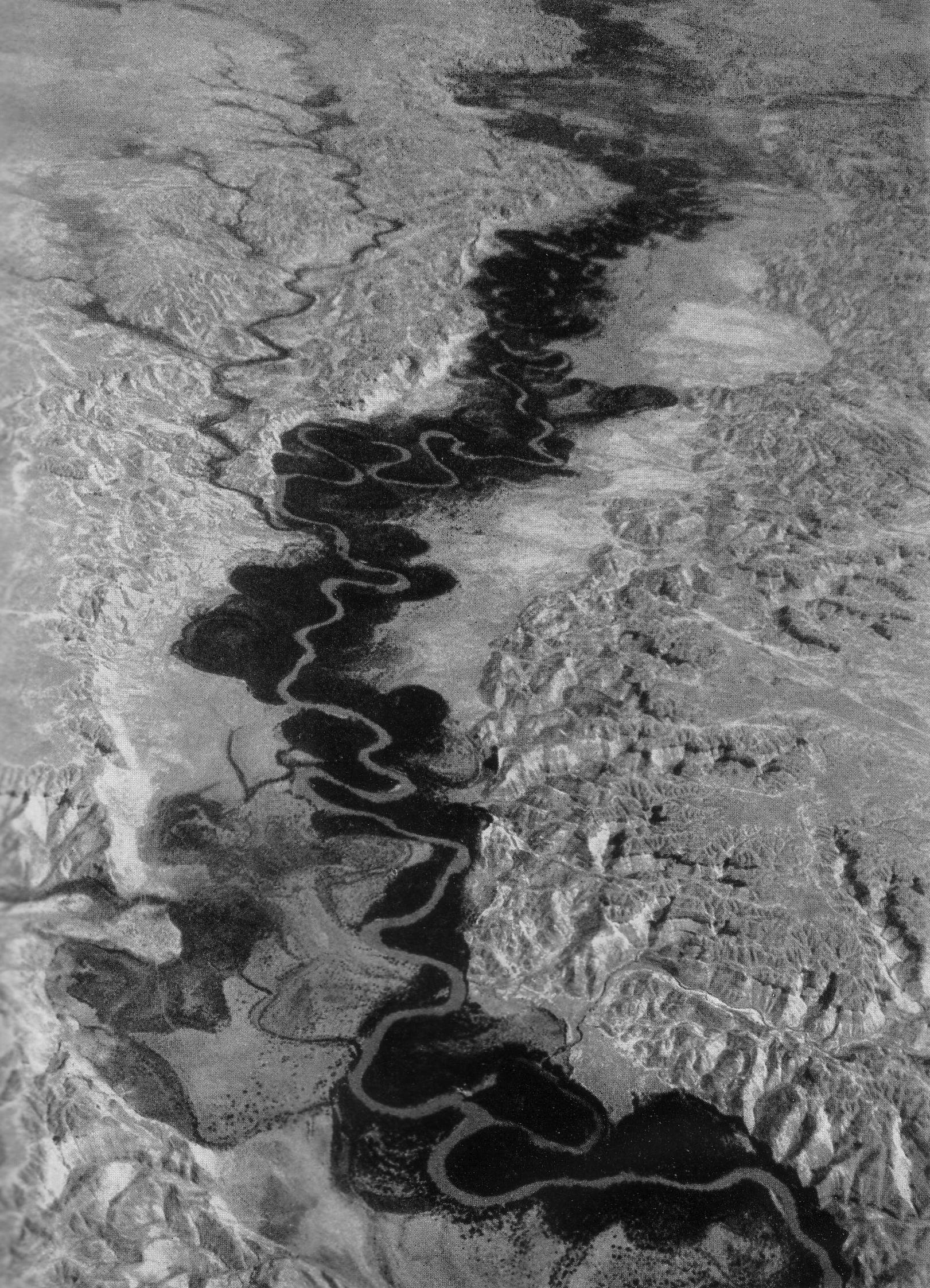
Aerial view, 1938

South of the Sea of Galilee, the river is situated about 210 metres (690 ft) below sea level. The last 120-kilometre-long (75 mi) section follows what is commonly termed the "Jordan Valley", which has less gradient (the total drop is another 210 metres) so that the river meanders before entering the Dead Sea, a terminal lake about 422 metres (1,385 ft) below sea level with no outlet. The river is fed by two major tributaries, the Yarmouk and Zarqa. The Yarmouk, the largest tributary of the lower course, forms the border between Syria and Jordan and then Jordan and Israel.

Smaller tributaries or "side wadis" / "side streams" in this segment are, north to south

- from the east (6–10 in total)
  - Wadi al-'Arab
  - Wadi Ziqlab
  - Wadi al-Yabis
  - Wadi Kafranja or Kufrinjah passing near Ajloun
  - Wadi Rajib, the last before Wadi Zarqa
  - Wadi Nimrin
- from the west
  - Nahal Yavne'el
  - Nahal Tavor (Tabor Stream)
  - Nahal Yissakhar
  - Nahal Harod
  - Nahal Bezeq, on the border between Israel and the West Bank, between Mount Gilboa and the Samaria Mountains
  - Wadi el Maleh from the Samaria Mountains
  - Wadi al-Far'a coming from the Nablus area
  - Wadi Auja (Arabic) or Nahal Yitav (Hebrew)
  - Wadi Qelt coming down from the Judean mountains and passing through Jericho

== History ==
In the 19th century the River Jordan and the Dead Sea were explored by boat primarily by Christopher Costigan in 1835, Thomas Howard Molyneux in 1847, William Francis Lynch in 1848, and John MacGregor in 1869. The full text of W. F. Lynch's 1849 book Narrative of the United States' Expedition to the River Jordan and the Dead Sea is available online.

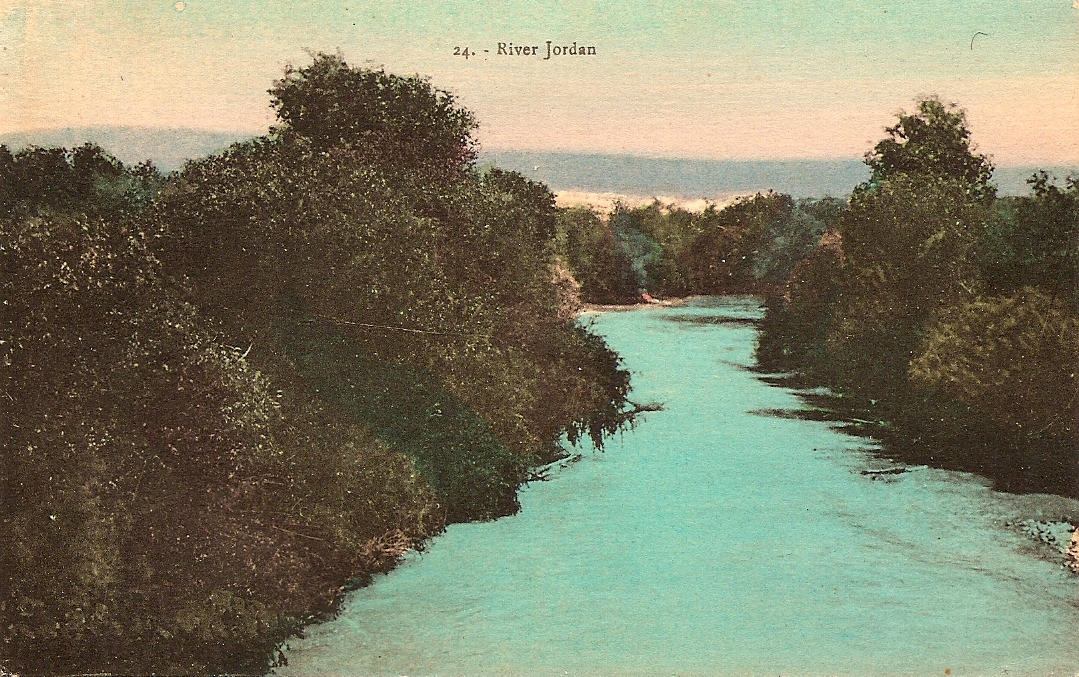
Coloured postcard of the Jordan River, by Karimeh Abbud, c. 1925

In 1964, Israel began operating a pumping station that diverts water from the Sea of Galilee to the National Water Carrier. Also in 1964, Jordan constructed a channel that diverted water from the Yarmouk to the East Ghor Canal. Syria has also built reservoirs that catch the Yarmouk's waters. Environmentalists blame Israel, Jordan and Syria for extensive damage to the Jordan River ecosystem.

== Environment ==
=== Ecology ===
The Jordan River basin has a unique ichthyofauna as it serves as the meeting point for several different biogeographic regions, including the northern Palearctic, the Afrotropics, East & South Asia, and the Mediterranean. Native fish include cyprinids such as the Jordan bream (Achanthobrama lissneri), Jordan himri (Carasobarbus canis), Jordan barbel (Luciobarbus longiceps), Levantine scraper (Capoeta damascina; the most common native fish in the basin), red garra (Garra rufa), & Damascus garra (Garra nana), hillstream loaches such as the Palestine loach (Oxynoemacheilus insignis), catfish such as the African sharptooth catfish (Clarias gariepinus), cichlids such as the blue tilapia (Oreochromis aureus), redbelly tilapia (Coptodon zillii), & mango tilapia (Sarotherodon galilaeus), and blennies such as the freshwater blenny (Salariopsis fluviatilis). The Jordan bream and Jordan barbel are thought to be endemic to the Jordan River basin. The Jordan basin may have also served as the center of diversification for several now-widespread Palearctic fish groups.

A native freshwater reptile is the Balkan terrapin (Mauremys rivulata), which is thought to have also been a food source for the earliest Neanderthal residents of the region.

Several introduced species of fish are known from the region, including common carp (Cyprinus carpio), grass carp (Ctenopharyngodon idella), black carp (Hypophthalmichthys molitrix), rainbow trout (Oncorhynchus mykiss), Nile tilapia (Oreochromis niloticus), and sea mullet (Mugil cephalus). Many of these introduced fish either prey on or outcompete native fish and threaten their populations, especially the more endangered species.

=== Flow ===
In modern times, up to 95% of the water is diverted for human purposes, and the flow is less than 10% of the past average. Because of this and the high evaporation rate of the Dead Sea, as well as industrial extraction of salts through evaporation ponds, the Dead Sea is rapidly shrinking. The flow rate of the Jordan River once was 1.3 billion cubic metres per year; as of 2010, just 20 to 30 million cubic metres per year flow into the Dead Sea.

=== Pollution ===
A small section of the northernmost portion of the Lower Jordan, the first ca. 3-kilometre (1.9 mi) below the Sea of Galilee, has been kept pristine for baptism and local tourism. Most polluted is the 100-kilometre (62 mi) downstream stretch—a meandering stream from above the confluence with the Yarmouk to the Dead Sea. Environmentalists say the practice of letting sewage and brackish water flow into the river has almost destroyed its ecosystem. Rescuing the Jordan could take decades, according to environmentalists. In 2007, FoEME named the Jordan River as one of the world's 100 most endangered ecological sites, due in part to lack of cooperation between Israel and neighboring Arab states.

== Roads, border crossings, and bridges ==
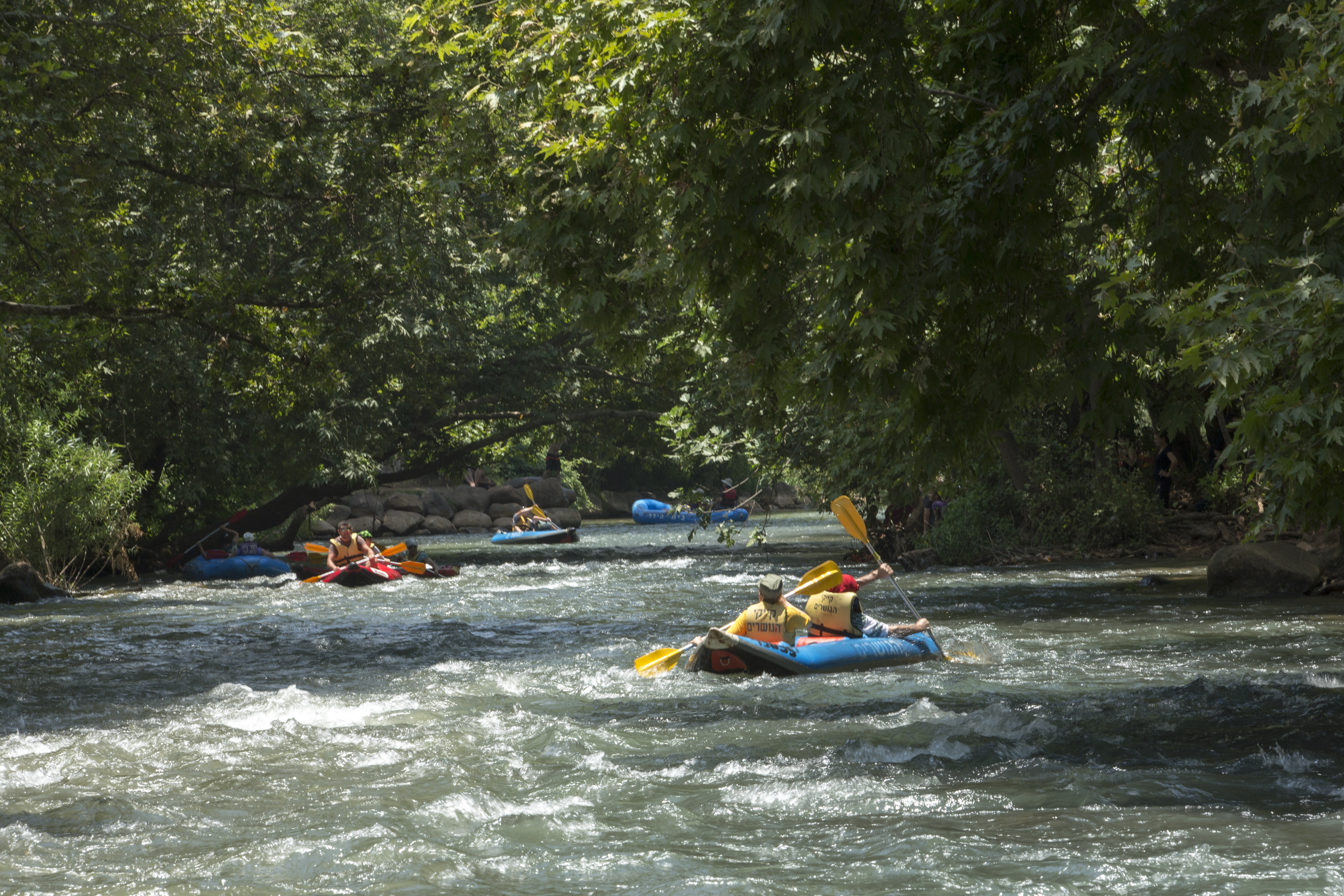
Rafting on Jordan River, northern Galilee

=== Roads ===
Route 90, part of which is named after Rehavam Zeevi, connects the northern and southern tips of the Israeli-occupied West Bank and parallels the Jordan River on the western side.

=== Border crossings (open bridges) ===
There are two border crossings between Israel and Jordan which cross the river over bridges. The northern one, Jordan River Crossing or Sheikh Hussein Bridge, is near Beit She'an; the southern one, Allenby Bridge (also King Hussein Bridge), is near Jericho.

=== Bridges (historical; modern: open and closed) ===
North to south:

- Daughters of Jacob Bridge (Hebrew: Gesher Bnot Ya'akov, "Daughters of Jacob Bridge") is the most famous one within Israel
- Arik Bridge at the northern end of the Sea of Galilee; allows access to the central Golan Heights, was crucial in the 1967 and 1973 wars
- Al-Sinnabra, at the spot where the river used to exit the Sea of Galilee in the past; few remains excavated by archaeologists
- Jisr el-Majami' north of Beit She'an/Beisan; closed
- Damiya or Adam Bridge halfway between Jericho and Beit She'an; closed
- King Abdullah Bridge south of the Allenby Bridge; closed.

== Importance as a water source ==
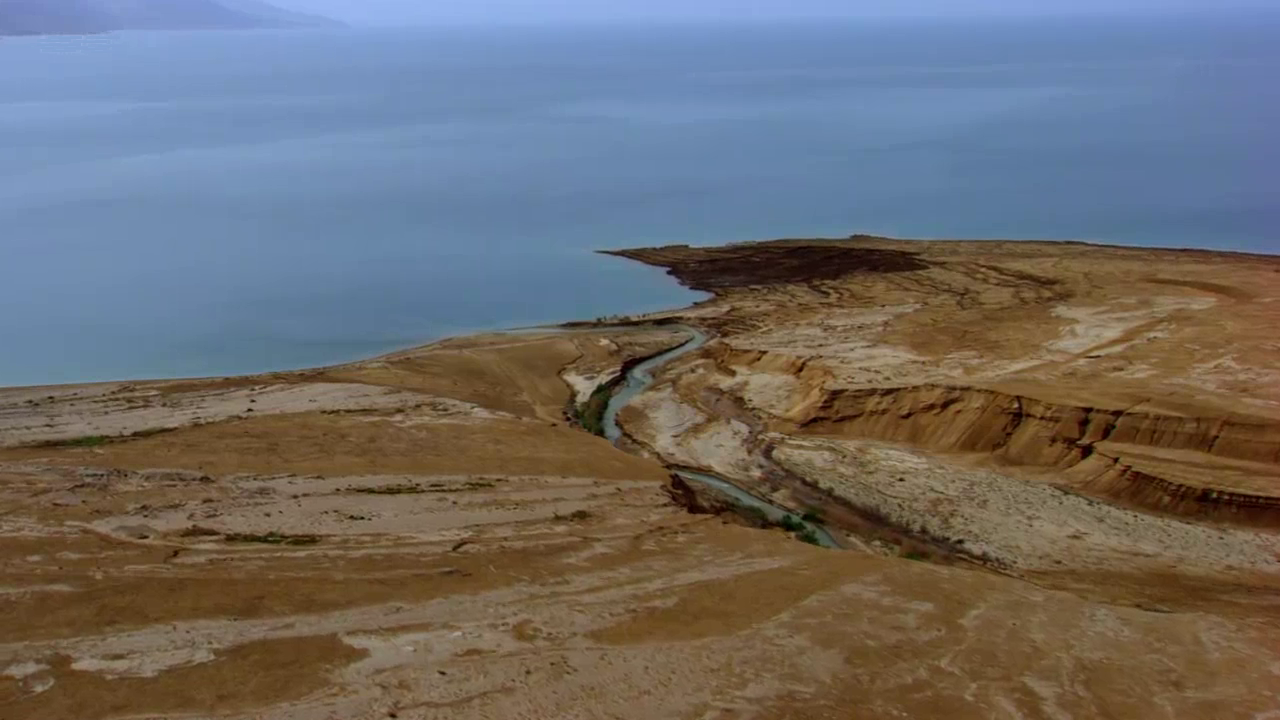
River Jordan draining into the Dead Sea

Until the first decade of the 21st century, the waters of the Jordan River had been the largest water resource for Israel; lately, desalinated sea water from the Mediterranean has taken over this role. Israel's National Water Carrier, completed in 1964, has delivered water from the Sea of Galilee to the Israeli coastal plain for over four decades, until prolonged drought led to abandoning this solution in favour of desalination.

Jordan receives 50,000,000 m^{3} (1.8 billion cu ft) of water from the river, a quantity which is regulated by the 1994 peace treaty with Israel. In the past, one of the main water resources in Jordan was the Jordan River, with a flow of 1.3 billion m^{3} per year (BCM/yr). However, after Israel built the National Water Carrier in 1953 and diverted water from the Sea of Galilee to Israel's coastal plains and southern desert, the flow of the Lower Jordan River dropped significantly. The 50 MCM/yr that Israel provides from the Sea of Galilee as part of the 1994 peace treaty was meant to compensate for this loss. A 2010 study found that the Lower Jordan River has been reduced to 2% of its historic flow. Water quality has also deteriorated sharply, with high levels of salinity and pollution from agricultural fertilizer and untreated wastewater upstream in Israel and the West Bank.

Conflict about the waters of the Jordan River was a contributing factor to the Six-Day War when, starting in 1965, Syria attempted to divert some of its headwaters in collaboration with Lebanon and Jordan. The diversion works would have reduced the water availability for Israel's carrier by about 35%, and Israel's overall water supply by about 11%.

== Religious significance ==
=== Hebrew Bible ===
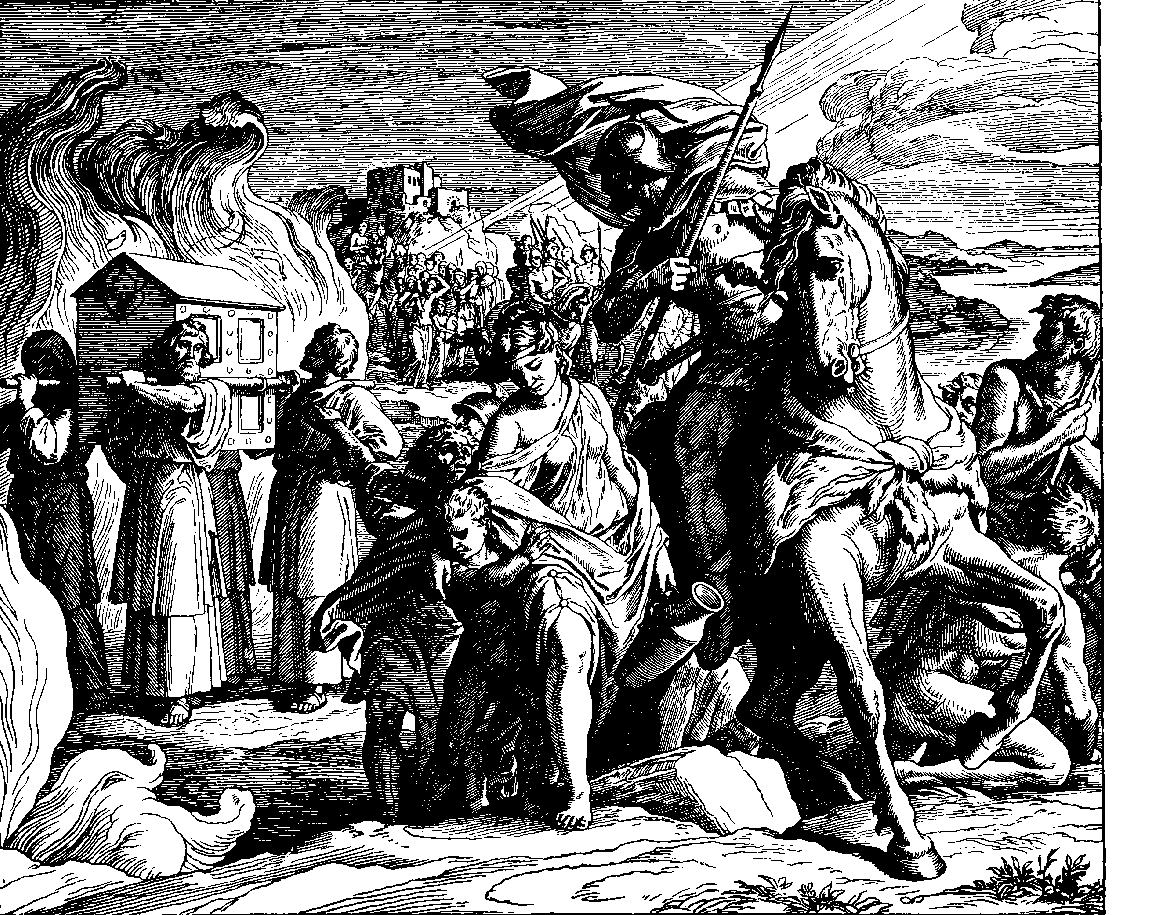
Crossing the Jordan, from Die Bibel in Bildern

In the Hebrew Bible the Jordan is referred to as the source of fertility of a large plain ("Kikkar ha-Yarden"), said to be watered like "the garden of the LORD" (Genesis 13:10). There is no regular description of the Jordan in the Bible; only scattered and indefinite references to it are given. Jacob crossed it and its tributary, the Jabbok (the modern Zarqa River), on his way back from Haran (Genesis 32:11, 32:23–24). It is noted as the line of demarcation between the "two tribes and the half tribe" settled to the east (Numbers 34:15) and the "nine tribes and the half tribe of Manasseh" that settled to the west (Joshua 13:7, passim).

Opposite Jericho, it is called "the Jordan of Jericho" (Numbers 34:15; 35:1). The Jordan has a number of fords, and one of them is famous as the place where many Ephraimites were slain by Jephthah (Judges 12:5–6). It seems that these are the same fords mentioned as being near Beth-barah, where Gideon lay in wait for the Midianites (Judges 7:24). In the plain of the Jordan, between Succoth and Zarthan, is the clay ground where Solomon had his bronze foundries (1 Kings 7:46). In 2 Kings 6:1–4 the Jordan valley is portrayed as a woodland region. Biblical commentator Albert Barnes suggests that "trees were rare in most parts of Palestine, but plentiful in the Jordan Valley".

In biblical history, the Jordan appears as the scene of several miracles, the first taking place when the Jordan, near Jericho, was crossed by the Israelites under Joshua (Joshua 3:15-17). Later the two tribes and the half tribe that settled east of the Jordan built a large altar on its banks as "a witness" between them and the other tribes (Joshua 22:10, 22:26, et seq.). The Jordan was crossed by Elijah and Elisha on dry ground (2 Kings 2:8, 2:14). Elisha performed two miracles at the Jordan: he healed Naaman's leprosy by having him bathe in its waters (2 Kings 5:14), and he made an axe head lost by one of the "children of the prophets" float, by throwing a piece of wood into the water (2 Kings 6:6).

=== New Testament ===
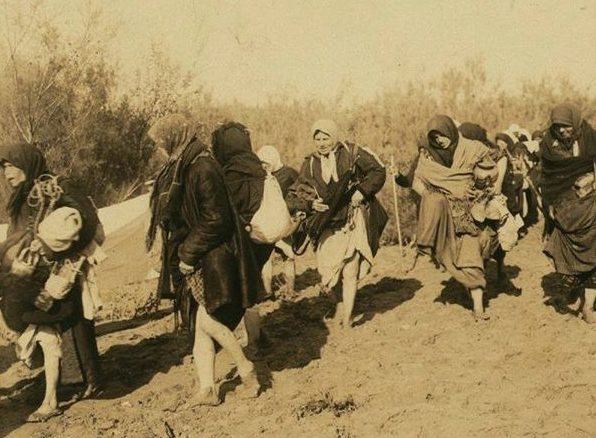
Christian women on pilgrimage to Al-Maghtas (1913)

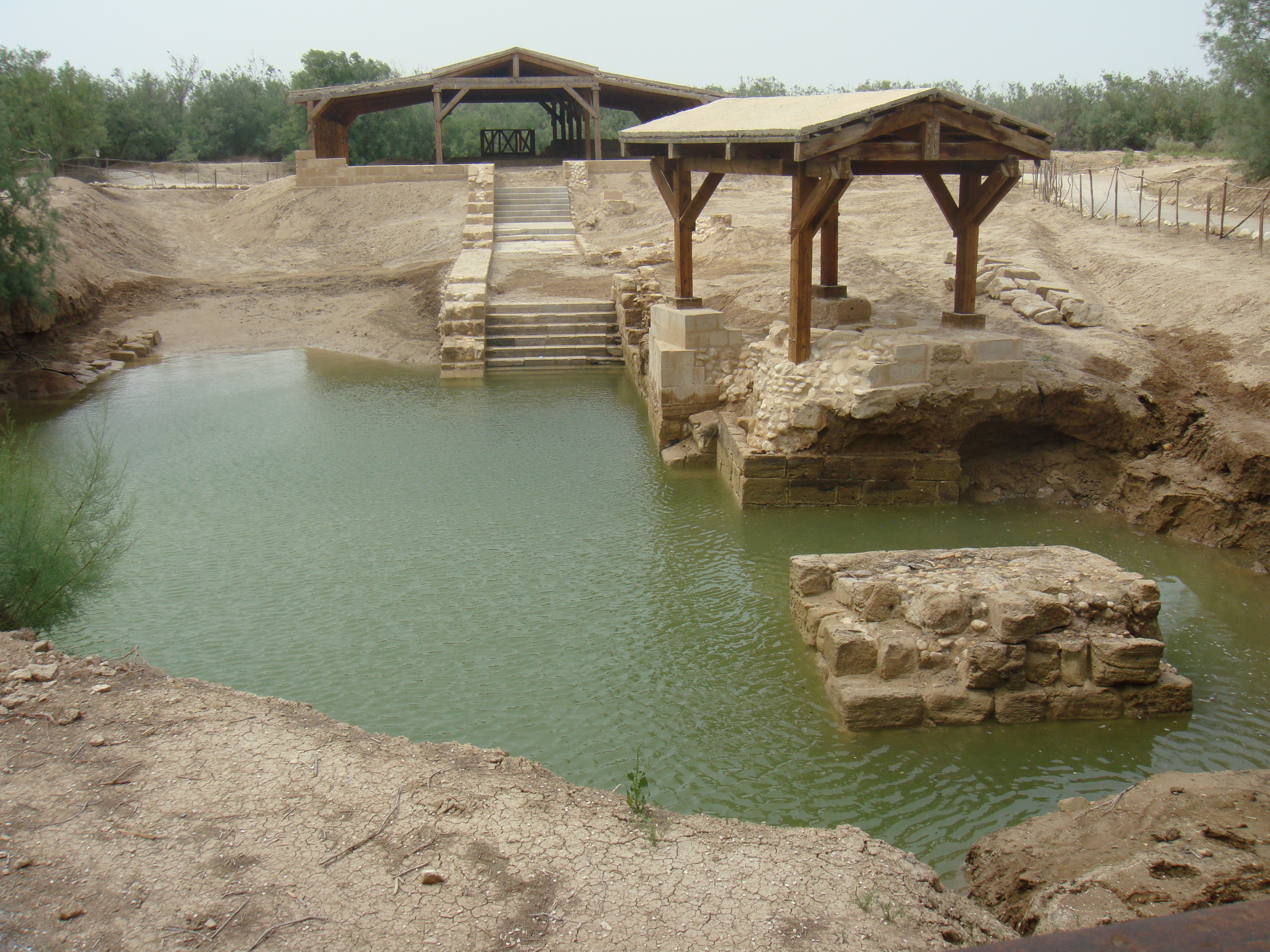
Al-Maghtas ruins on the Jordanian side of the Jordan River are the putative location for the Baptism of Jesus and the ministry of John the Baptist.

The New Testament states that John the Baptist baptised unto repentance in the Jordan (Matthew 3:5–6; Mark1:5; Luke 3:3; John1:28). These acts of baptism are also reported as having taken place at Bethabara (John 1:28). Jesus came to be baptised by him there (Matthew 3:13; Mark 1:9; Luke 3:21, 4:1). The Jordan is also where John the Baptist bore record of Jesus as the Son of God and Lamb of God (John 1:29–36). The prophecy of Isaiah regarding the Messiah which names the Jordan (Isaiah 9:1–2) is reported in Matthew 4:15.

The New Testament speaks several times about Jesus crossing the Jordan during his ministry (Matthew 19:1; Mark 10:1) and of believers crossing the Jordan to come hear him preach and to be healed of their diseases (Matthew 4:25; Mark 3:7–8). When his enemies sought to capture him, Jesus took refuge at the river in the place John had first baptised (John 10:39–40).

Scholars have concluded that the site called Al-Maghtas on the east side has long been considered the location for the Baptism of Jesus and a place of pilgrimage. This has led to the selection of Al-Maghtas as a UNESCO World Heritage site in 2015.

=== Derived cultural significance ===
==== Symbolism ====
Because, according to Jewish tradition, the Israelites made a difficult and hazardous journey from slavery in Egypt to freedom in the Promised Land, the Jordan can refer to freedom. The actual crossing is the final step of the journey, which is then complete.

Among many other references, the Jordan River is given this meaning in the text of Old Man River: "Let me go 'way from the Mississippi / Let me go 'way from the white man boss / Show me that stream called the River Jordan / That's the old stream that I long to cross".

==== Christening of royals ====
Because of the baptism of Jesus, water from the Jordan is employed for the christening of children in several Christian royal houses, such as the cases of Prince George of Wales, Simeon of Bulgaria and James Ogilvy. Earlier, On 15 May 1717, the future empress, Maria Theresa, was baptised in Vienna by the Papal Nuntius Giorgio Spinola, representing Pope Clement XI, with baptismal water containing a few drops from the River Jordan.

==== Christian poetry and music ====
The Jordan is a frequent symbol in folk, gospel, and spiritual music, and in poetic and literary works. The baptism of Jesus is referred to in a hymn by the reformer Martin Luther, "Christ unser Herr zum Jordan kam" (1541), base for a cantata by Johann Sebastian Bach, Christ unser Herr zum Jordan kam, BWV 7 (1724).

The Jordan River, due primarily to its rich spiritual importance, has provided inspiration for countless songs, hymns, and stories, including the traditional African-American spiritual/folk songs "Michael Row the Boat Ashore", "Deep River", and "Roll, Jordan, Roll". It is mentioned in the songs "Eve of Destruction", "Will You Be There", and "The Wayfaring Stranger" and in "Ol' Man River" from the musical Show Boat. "The Far Side Banks of Jordan" by Johnny Cash and June Carter Cash on June's Grammy Award-winning studio album, Press On, mentions the Jordan River as well as the Promised Land. Jordan River is the subject of roots reggae artist Burning Spear's song of the same title. Belarusian band Spasenie dedicated its whole album "Crossing the Jordan" to the topic.

==== Islam ====
The Jordan River holds significant status in Islam as part of a "blessed land" (Ardh Mubaraka) referenced in the Quran, associated with prophets like Musa (Moses), Isa (Jesus), and Yaqub (Jacob). It is a site of historical battles, pilgrimage to the tombs of Prophet Muhammad’s companions, and is considered a sacred location.

== See also ==
- Ænon
- Ed-Dikke synagogue
- Fair river sharing
- Island of Peace
- Jordan Rift Valley
- List of most-polluted rivers
- List of rivers of Israel
- List of rivers of Jordan
- Mandaeans
- Naharayim
- Sacred waters
