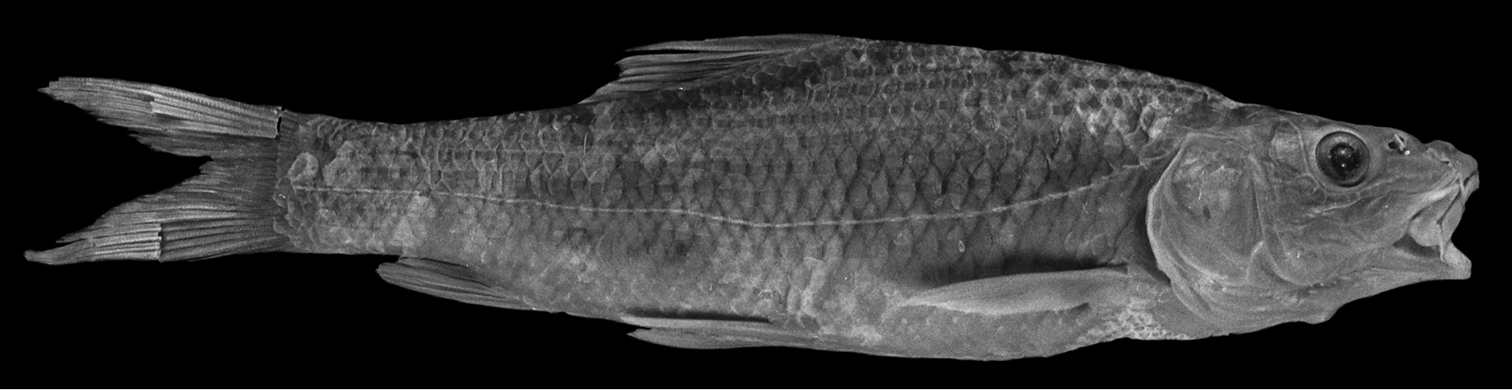

Conservation status
- Endangered (IUCN 3.1)

Scientific classification
- Kingdom: Animalia
- Phylum: Chordata
- Class: Actinopterygii
- Order: Cypriniformes
- Family: Cyprinidae
- Subfamily: Barbinae
- Genus: Luciobarbus
- Species: L. longiceps

Binomial name
- Luciobarbus longiceps Valenciennes in Cuvier & Valenciennes, 1842

Synonyms
- Barbus longiceps

= Jordan barbel =

Species of fish

The Jordan barbel (Luciobarbus longiceps) is a species of ray-finned fish in the family Cyprinidae. It is found in Israel, Jordan, and Syria. Its natural habitats are rivers and freshwater lakes. It is threatened by habitat loss.
