= Dan River (Middle East) =

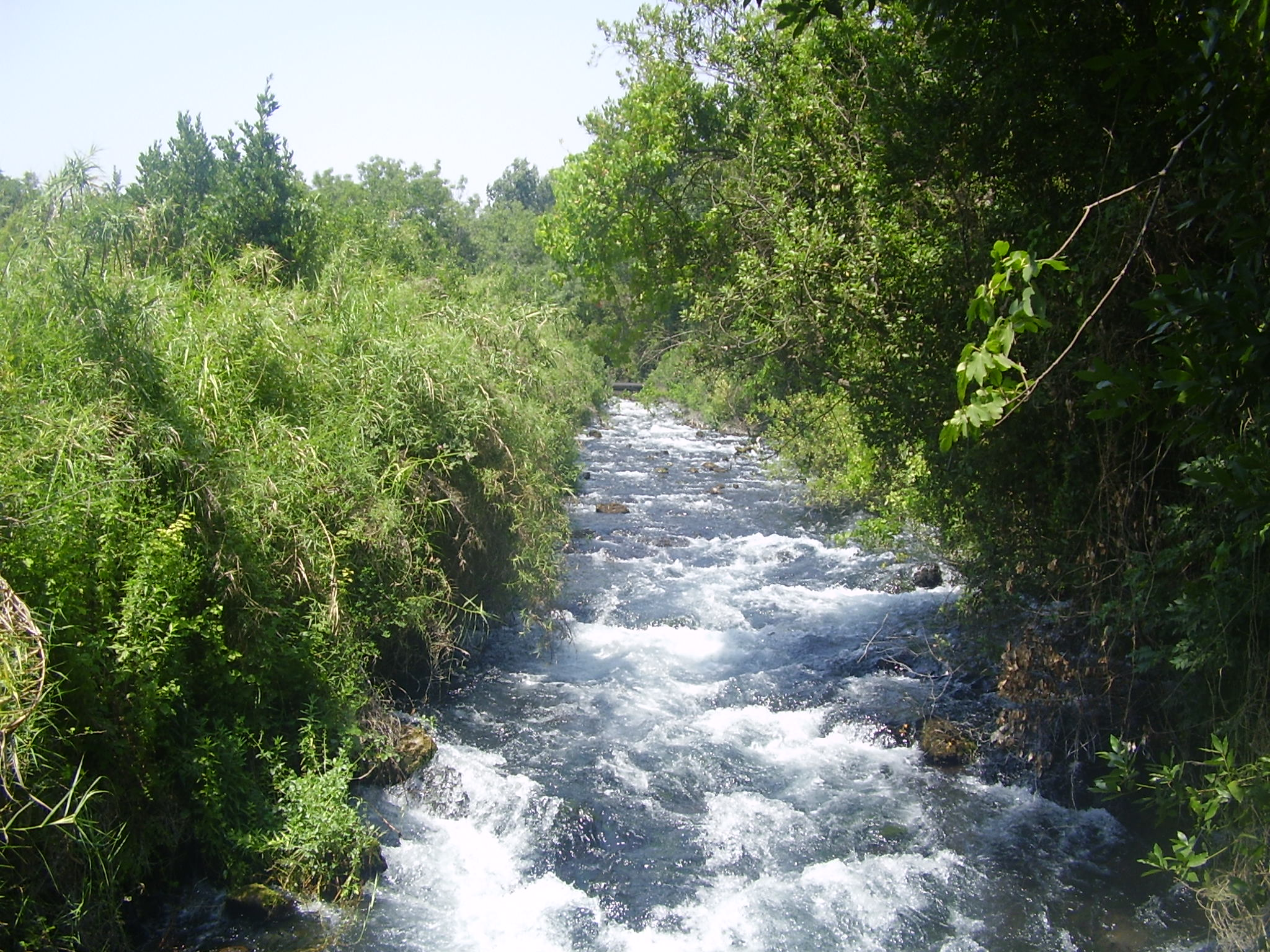
- Dan River in Tel Dan Nature Reserve

Physical characteristics
- Source: Tel Dan
  - location: northern Israel
  - coordinates: 33°14′56″N 35°39′7″E
- Mouth: Jordan River
  - location: Sde Nehemia kibbutz in northern Israel
  - coordinates: 33°11′15″N 35°37′10″E

The Dan (Hebrew: דן, romanized: Dan; Arabic: اللدان, romanized: Leddan) is a tributary of the Jordan River. The sources of the Dan are multiple springs emerging from Tel Dan along underground fault lines. The Dan River joins the Hasbani River at a point in northern Israel to form the River Jordan.

The river is so named after the Israelite city of Dan, which was captured by the Tribe of Dan during the Judges period. The tribe of Dan conquered the city, named Laish at the time, which was then occupied by Canaanites.

Although the Dan River itself is only about 20 km (12 miles) long, its flow provides up to 238 million cubic meters of water annually to the Hulah Valley. In 1966, this was a cause of dispute between Israeli water planners and conservationists, with the latter prevailing after three years of court appeals and adjudication. The result was a conservation project of about 120 acres (0.49 km^{2}) at the source of the river called the Tel Dan Nature Reserve.
