= Hasbani River =

River in West Asia

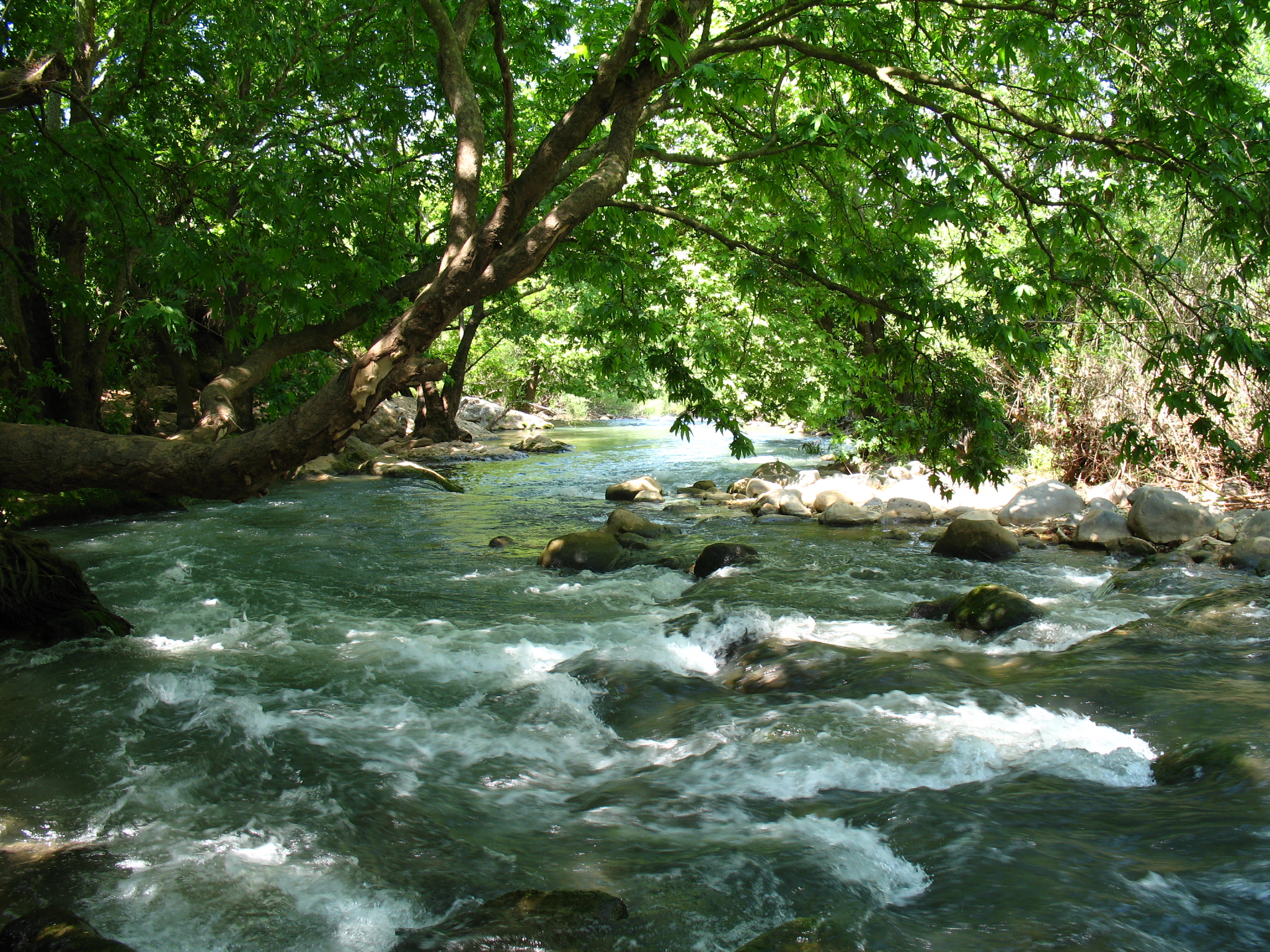
- Hazbani river in south Lebanon

Physical characteristics
- Source: Wazzani in Lebanon
  - coordinates: 33°14′17″N 35°37′29″E
- 2nd source: Haqzbieh
- Mouth: Jordan River
  - location: Israel
  - coordinates: 33°11′15″N 35°37′10″E

The Hasbani (Arabic: الحاصباني / ALA-LC: al-Ḥāṣbānī, is the major tributary of the Jordan River that flows in Lebanon, the Golan Heights and northern Israel. In the mid-19th century, what the Westerners would call 'Upper Jordan River', the locals called Nahr Hasbani, Arabic for Hasbani River.

The Hasbani River derives most of its discharge from two springs in Lebanon, the Wazzani and the Haqzbieh, the latter being a group of springs on the uppermost Hasbani. The Hasbani runs for 25 mi (40 km) through the Wadi al-Taym in Lebanon before crossing the border at Ghajar and shortly after joining with the Banias and Dan Rivers at a point in northern Israel, to form the River Jordan. For about 4 km (2.5 mi) downstream of Ghajar, the Hasbani forms the border between Lebanon and the Golan Heights.

The Wazzani's and the Haqzbieh's combined discharge averages 138 million m³ per year. About 20% of the Hasbani flow emerges from the Wazzani Spring at Ghajar, close to the Lebanese-Golan Heights border, about 3 km (1.9 mi) west of the base of Mount Hermon. The contribution of the Wazzani spring is very important to the river, since this is the only continuous year-round flow into the Hasbani, in either Lebanon or Israel.

== In modern history ==
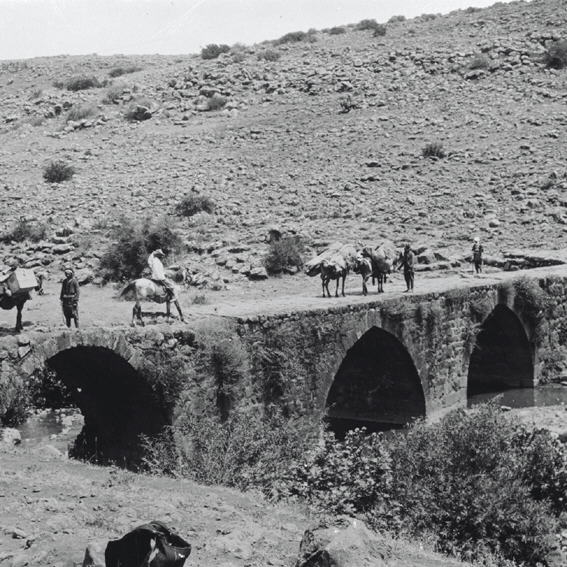
Bridge over Hasbani River 1920

The Hasbani was included in the Jordan Valley Unified Water Plan, proposed in 1955 by special US envoy Eric Johnston. Under the plan, Lebanon was allocated usage of 35 million mcm annually from it. The plan was rejected by the Arab League. Instead, at the 2nd Arab summit conference in Cairo of January 1964 the League decided that Syria, Lebanon and Jordan would begin a water diversion project. Syria started the construction of canal to divert the flow of the Banias River away from Israel and along the slopes of the Golan toward the Yarmouk River. Lebanon was to construct a canal from the Hasbani River to Banias and complete the scheme. The project was to divert 20 to 30 million cubic metres of water from the river Jordan tributaries to Syria and Jordan for the development of Syria and Jordan. This led to military intervention from Israel, first with tank and artillery fire and then, as the Syrians shifted the works further eastward, with airstrikes.

Utilization of water resources in the area, including the Hasbani, has been a source of conflict and was one of the factors leading to the 1967 Six-Day War.

In 2001, the Lebanese government installed a small pumping station with a 10 cm bore to extract water to supply Ghajar village. In March 2002 Lebanon also diverted part of the Hasbani to supply Wazzani village. An action that Ariel Sharon said was a "casus belli" and could lead to war.

The Mekorot Water Company Ltd. of Israel has permitted recreational activity (kayaking) on a stretch of the Hasbani in the north.

== Nahal Snir Nature Reserve ==
In its part near Ein Baruch, the stream is located within the boundaries of the Nahal Snir Nature Reserve. In this section, there is a hiking trail that begins in the reserve, parts of which pass through the stream and its vicinity. The trail ends on Highway 99 near the Ein Baruch parking lot.
