= Spasenie =

Belarusian Christian and pop rock band

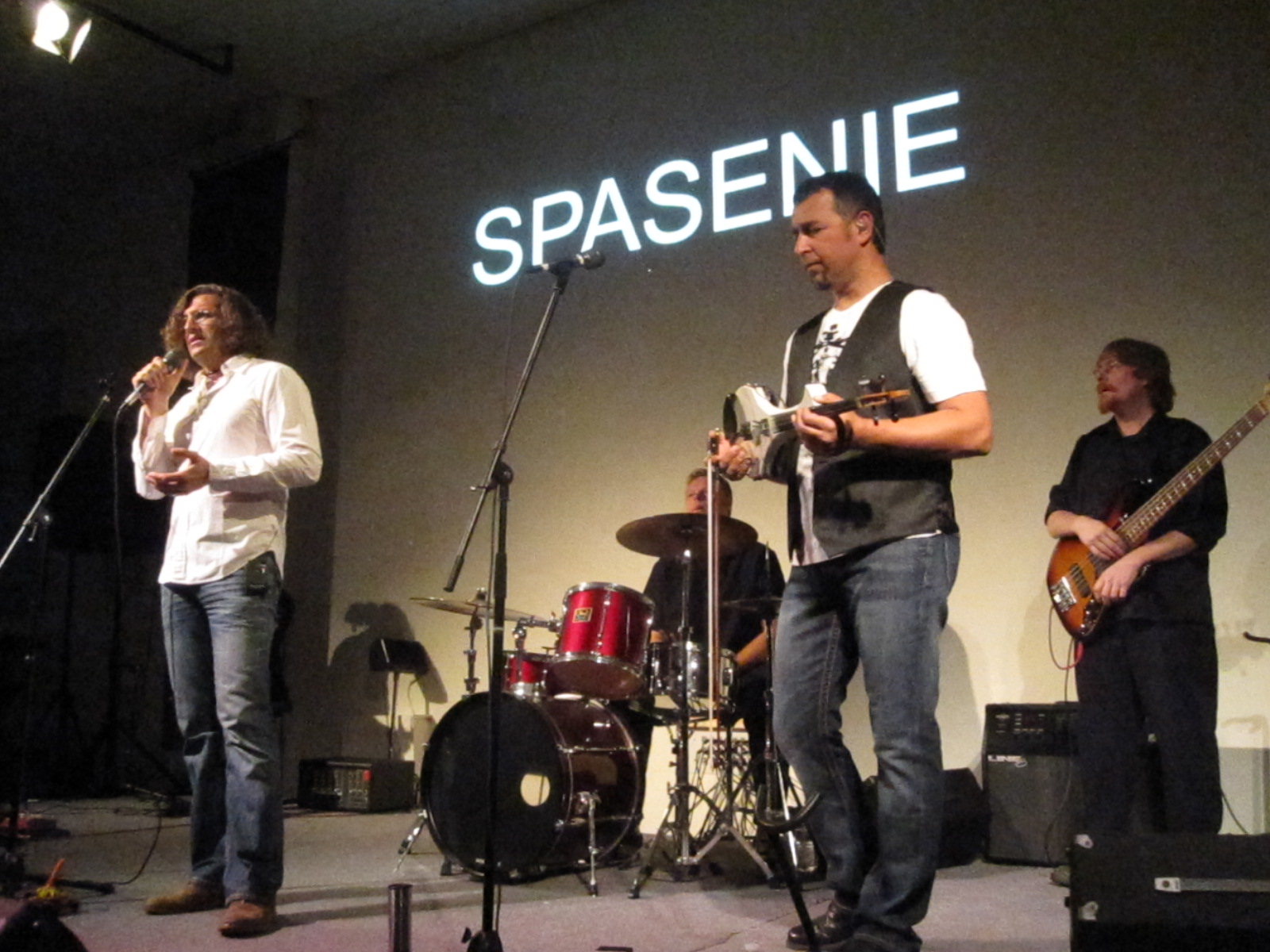
- Igor Mukha, Dave Geer, Pavel Shelpuk, Mike Choby (from left to right) from Spasenie in 2011

Background information
- Also known as: Спасение
- Origin: Brest, Belarus
- Genres: Christian rock, pop rock
- Years active: 1989 – present
- Labels: Music Center C, Новое Христианское Творчество
- Members: Igor Mukha, Pavel Shelpuk, Peter Semenuk, Mike Choby, Dmitriy Golodko
- Website: spasenie.com

Spasenie is a Belarusian Christian and pop rock band from Brest, which formed in 1989.

== History ==
The band was formed in August 1989, when an impromptu concert they gave in Brest City Park spontaneously gathered about 150 people. After the performance, the players soon formed the band.

In the same year, they started to rehearse, wrote the first songs and, a few months later, were invited to tour across Yakutia.

For the band's 17th anniversary, they gave a big concert with the orchestra at the Palace of the Republic, which recording was released on the DVD 17 Live in 2006.

A feature of the band is that music is written by not one but all members.

The band has very often toured abroad: with performances, musicians attended the Baltic countries, Ukraine, Romania, Poland, Germany, Canada, Russia, the US, the UK, South Korea, South Africa, and more regions.

On August 3, 2019, the band celebrated the 30th anniversary with a major concert with the orchestra at Lenin Square in Brest.

== Name ==
The name "Spasenie" (Russian: Спасение; transl. Salvation) was chosen while on a train to Yakutia in the early 1990s to represent that they see music as salvation

== Language ==
For the first 15 years of its existence, the band sang exclusively in Russian, but with the release of the album Crossing the Jordan, the English language became heard much more frequently in their songs. Vocalist Igor Mukha answered Volha Samusik from Muzykalnaya Gazeta on the language, saying

We live in Brest. This is actually the border. Its peculiar feature is the mixture of languages. There are a lot of words from Ukrainian, Polish... There was never neither the clean Belarusian nor the Russian language. Therefore, we sang not in the native but in the Russian language. Although I recognize the indisputable melodicism of Belarusian, English is also very musically flexible. If we compare it with Russian, then to sing in the last one is harder because of all these combinations of letters "br," "str," etc. So it was not difficult to switch for us.

== Social activity ==
Every year since 2005 the band holds the rock music festival-competition "X-Star" and organizes an annual large youth concert in Brest called "The City of Light" (Russian: "Город света") since 2009. The participants also oppose abortion.

In 2019 the band prepared and launched a guided tour together with National Academy of Sciences of Belarus named "Brest is the city of the Bible."

== Discography ==
=== Albums ===
- Хабаровский край (1992)
- Возвращение домой (musical) (1992)
- Старые песни (1992)
- Мой Бог скала (1993)
- Только Ты (1995)
- Человек без зубила (1997)
- Бьют часы (1998)
- Exit (1999)
- Летит безжалостное время (2000)
- ...а Солнце за кормой (2001)
- Еврейский альбом (2001)
- Без слов о том же (with Igor Rudy) (2003)
- Кардиограмма (2003)
- Crossing the Jordan (feat. Tim Spransy and Becky Sharp) (2004)
- Acoustic (2007)
- Spasenie (2009)
- Reboot (wth Brian Montrey) (2011)
- Вечные слова (2012)

=== Compilation albums ===
- 10 лет, The Best (1999)

=== Live DVD ===
- 17 Live (2007)

=== Participation in collections ===
- Серебряный граммофон (2006) (All-National TV), (track "Плачет небо").
- Золотая 20: зима 2007 (2006) (West Records), (track "Плачет небо").

=== Music videos ===
- Никто кроме Тебя
- Расстояние (2003)
- На метр от земли (2004)
- Плачет небо / The Word Was Spoken (2005)
- Осень
- Странные сны

== Awards and nominations ==
2006 – Alpha-radio Awards "Russian: Золотое ухо".

2009 – nomination in the contest "Just Pain Folks Music Awards" for the song "... а Солнце за кормой".

2009 – nomination in the category "For Contribution to the Development of Music" at the Annual Gospel Music Association Awards.

2010 – the Radio Brest festival "Russian: Знай Наших - 3": Best Band, Best Frontman (Igor Mukha).

2019 – diploma of the Brest City Council of Deputies.

== Band members ==
- Igor Mukha – vocals, saxophone, acoustic guitar (1989—)
- Pavel Shelpuk – vocals, violin, guitars, bass (1989—)
- Peter Semenuk – keyboards, vocals (1989—)
- Mike Choby – bass
- Dmitriy Golodko – solo guitar

Lyricist

- Alex Borisyuk – guitar (1989—)

Sound engineer

- Andrey Kovalchuk

Former members and tour musicians

Tatiana Shelpuk (vocals, keyboards), Vadim Semenuk (drums), Vitaly Kalezhinsky (drums), Yezhy Khaichuk (drums), Alex Manetskiy (drums), Dave Geer (drums), Leonid Borisevich (solo guitar), Vasily Mashliakevich (bass), Stanislav Yanchin (bass), Dmitriy Branavitsckiy, Andrey Kleshchov, Danny Platt, Brian Montrey, etc.

== Literature ==
- Alaksandra Rohach (2008). "«Spasenie»". Энцыклапедыя беларускай папулярнай музыкі. уклад. Дз. Падбярэзскі і інш (2000 экз ed.). Мінск: Zmicier Kołas. pp. 292–293. ISBN 978-985-6783-42-8.
