= Crossing the Jordan =

Studio album by Spasenie
- Released: December 3, 2004
- Recorded: 2003–2004
- Studio: С
- Genres: Christian rock, pop rock, jazz rock
- Length: 58:52
- Language: English
- Labels: East Meets West Records, Music Center C
- Producers: Tim Spransy, Daryl Stuermer (in the United States), Pavel Shelpuk

Spasenie chronology
Кардиограмма (2003)	Crossing the Jordan (2004)	Acoustic (2007)

Crossing the Jordan is a studio album by Belarusian band Spasenie recorded together with musicians of Chicago band Crossroads and released in 2004. It was recorded in Brest, the producers of the record are Tim Spransy and Daryl Stuermer (in the United States). The first presentation of the CD in Belarus was held in Minsk on July 29, 2005, with the support of producer Tim Spransy and his band Crossroads at the club Bielaja vieža.

== History ==
The title song on the disc is a biblical story.

The album Crossing the Jordan is a serious indicator of our band’s professional growth. When creating, recording, and mixing, all of the compositions were thought out to the smallest detail and sustained in the same style,

vocalist Igor Mukha told the portal TUT.BY.

CD sales exceeded all the expectations of Brest musicians.

== Tracklisting ==
No.	Title	Writer(s)	Length
1.	"The Word Was Spoken"	Tim Spransy	4:25
2.	"Hold On"	Tim Spransy	4:48
3.	"The Garden of the King"	Tim Spransy	4:14
4.	"Son of Mercy"	Tim Spransy, Maura Spransy	4:14
5.	"Live Wire"	Tim Spransy, Igor Mukha, Peter Semenuk, Pavel Shelpuk	4:42
6.	"Joshua’s Dream"	Tim Spransy, Igor Mukha, Peter Semenuk, Pavel Shelpuk	4:52
7.	"New Song"	Tim Spransy, Maura Spransy	4:31
8.	"You Are Merciful"	Tim Spransy	4:17
9.	"Reign on Me"	Tim Spransy	4:48
10.	"Every Day"	Tim Spransy	4:53
11.	"I’m Watching the World Go By"	Tim Spransy, Maura Spransy	4:25
12.	"Do You Know Why"	Tim Spransy, Maura Spransy	3:37
13.	"Psalm 141"	Tim Spransy	5:06

== Critical reception ==
Tat’yana Zamirovskaya from the weekly BelGazeta on its pages noted that the album is associated with Sting, Phil Collins, and Mark Knopfler, and the compositions on it are “refined and melancholic jazz rock with folk elements.”

WASP from the music newspaper Muzykalnaya Gazeta heard on the CD soft pop rock, more harmonious than the one that the band Novi Ierusalim performs, and praised the work of producer Tim Spransy, while songs from the disc also reminded the critic the works of Sting and Phil Collins.

== Personnel ==
Musicians:

- Peter Semenuk — keyboards, vocals.
- Pavel Shelpuk — violin, viola, vocals.
- Alex Zinov’ev — double bass.
- Svetlana Pravdina — cello.
- Vasily Mashliakevich – bass guitar.
- Yezhy Khaichuk — drums.
- Jim Spransy — percussion.
- Tim Spransy — vocals, acoustic and electric guitar.
- Leonid Borisevich — electric guitar.
- Igor Rudy — soprano saxophone, alto saxophone, clarinet.
- Becky Sharp — vocals.
- Igor Mukha — vocals.

Production:

- Alex Borisyuk — pastoral care.
- Sue Brandt — administrator.
- Tim Spransy — CD design, photos, executive producer.
- Brianna Spransy — photos.
- Michael Vilson — photos.
- Pavel Shelpuk — executive recording engineer, executive producer.
- Andrei Kovalchuk — assistant recording engineer.
- Pavel Shelpuk, studio «С» — mixing.
- Waldemar Siemens — mastering.
- Studio «С» — mastering.
