= Nadzeja Sznarkiewicz =

Belarusian feminist and teacher

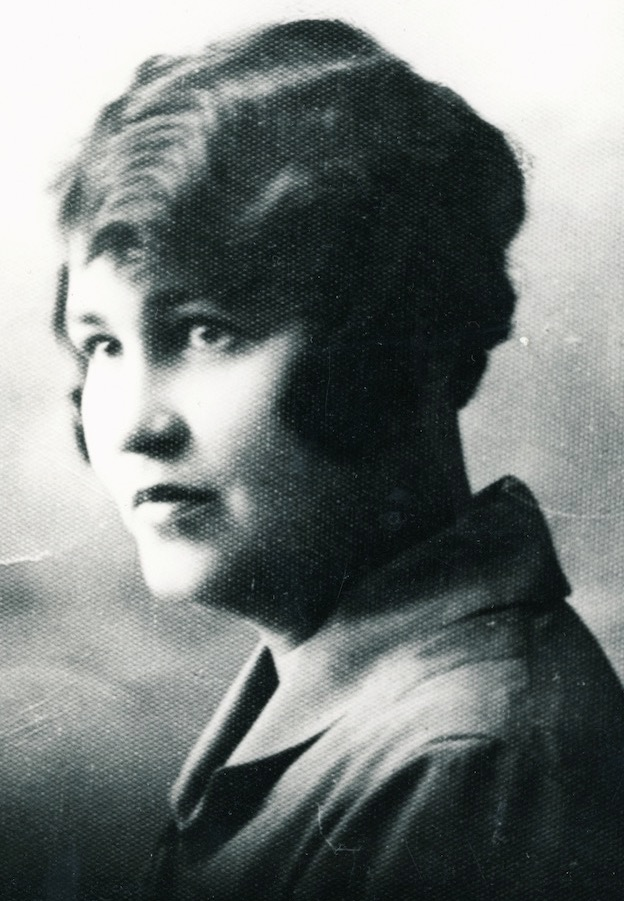
- Sznarkiewicz in 1929
- Born: 12 October 1897; Brest, Russian Empire (now Belarus)
- Died: 21 May 1974 (aged 76); Vilnius, Lithuania
- Occupations: Feminist, teacher and editor
- Spouse: Jazep Sznarkiewicz

Nadzeja Sznarkiewicz, née Kaladzianka (12 October 1897New Style – 21 May 1974) was a Belarusian feminist, teacher and editor.

== Life ==
Nadzeja Sznarkiewicz was born on 12 October 1897 in Brest, Russian Empire (now Belarus). After her father died in 1904, she and her mother moved to the village of Wostrawa, near Kobryn, and later to Pruzhany. She graduated from the women's gymnasium in 1914 and then qualified as a teacher five years later, although she'd been working as a teacher after graduating. She fled the advancing German troops in mid-1915, and returned four years later. After the Russo-Polish War of 1920–21, the victorious Poles incorporated western Belarus into Poland and pressured the Belarusians to adopt the Polish language. Sznarkiewicz moved to Wilno, Poland (now Vilnius, Lithuania), in 1925 where she worked for the Wilno Belarusian Gymnasium. She was active in the Belarusian School Association which promoted Belarusian language and culture. She married Jazep Sznarkiewicz, a political activist and teacher, in 1926. Sznarkiewicz was crippled by paralysis for the last quarter century of her life, but nonetheless remained active before dying on 21 May 1974.

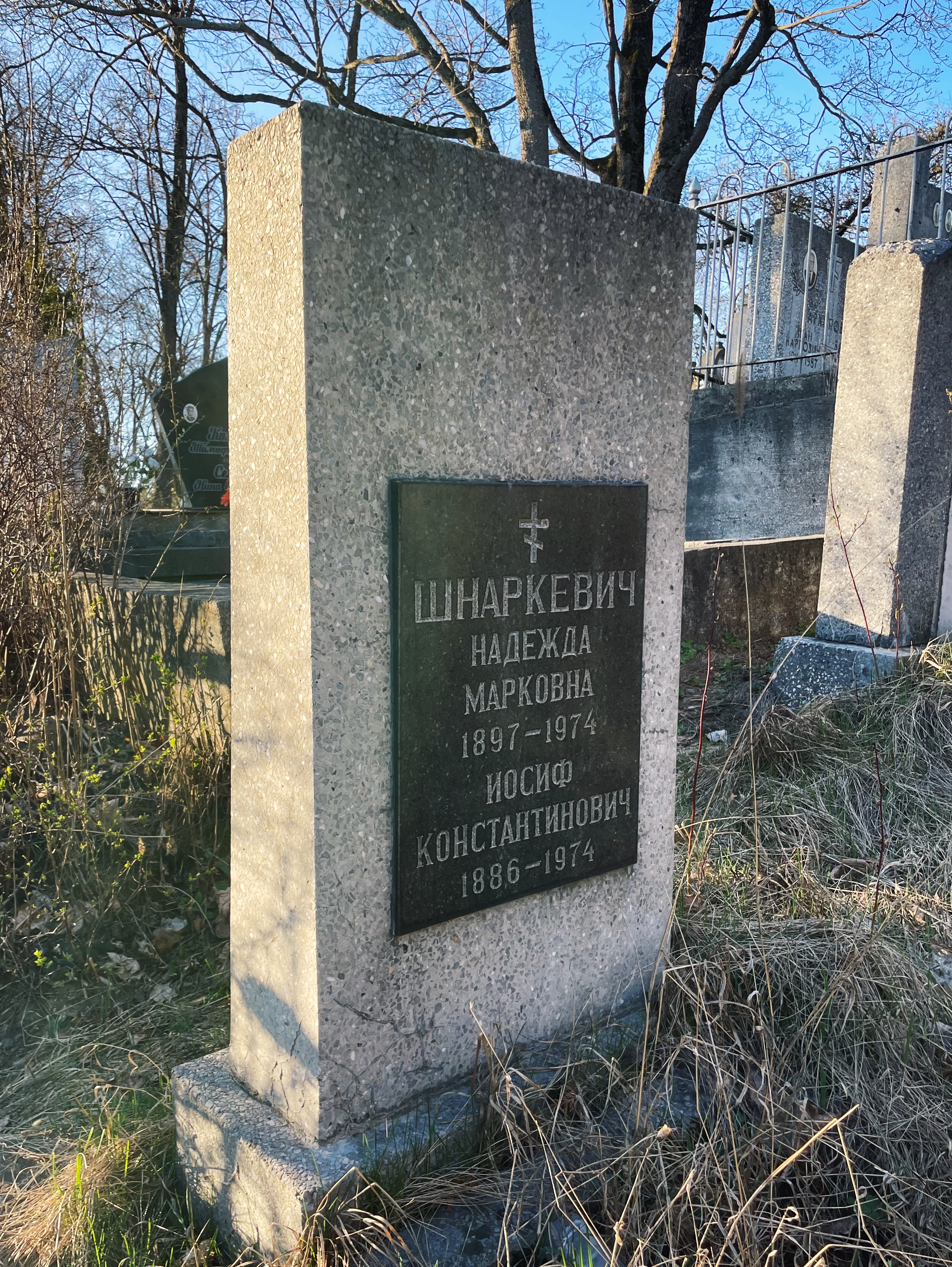
Monument on the grave of Nadzeja and Jazep Sznarkiewicz

== Activities ==
Sznarkiewicz co-founded the short-lived Alaiza Pashkevich Belarusian Women's Organization (Ab'jadnanne belaruskih zhanchyn imya Alaizy Pashkievich) in 1931 and was one of the founders and the editor-in-chief of Women's Cause (Zhanotskaya sprava), the first independent women's magazine in the Belarusian language.

== Publications ==
- Успаміны з працы ў Таварыстве Беларускае Школы ў Вільні (1924-1930 гады). Рунь, 1997, №4, 1997, №6
