= Brest, Belarus =

Brest Брэст (Belarusian) Брест (Russian)
- City
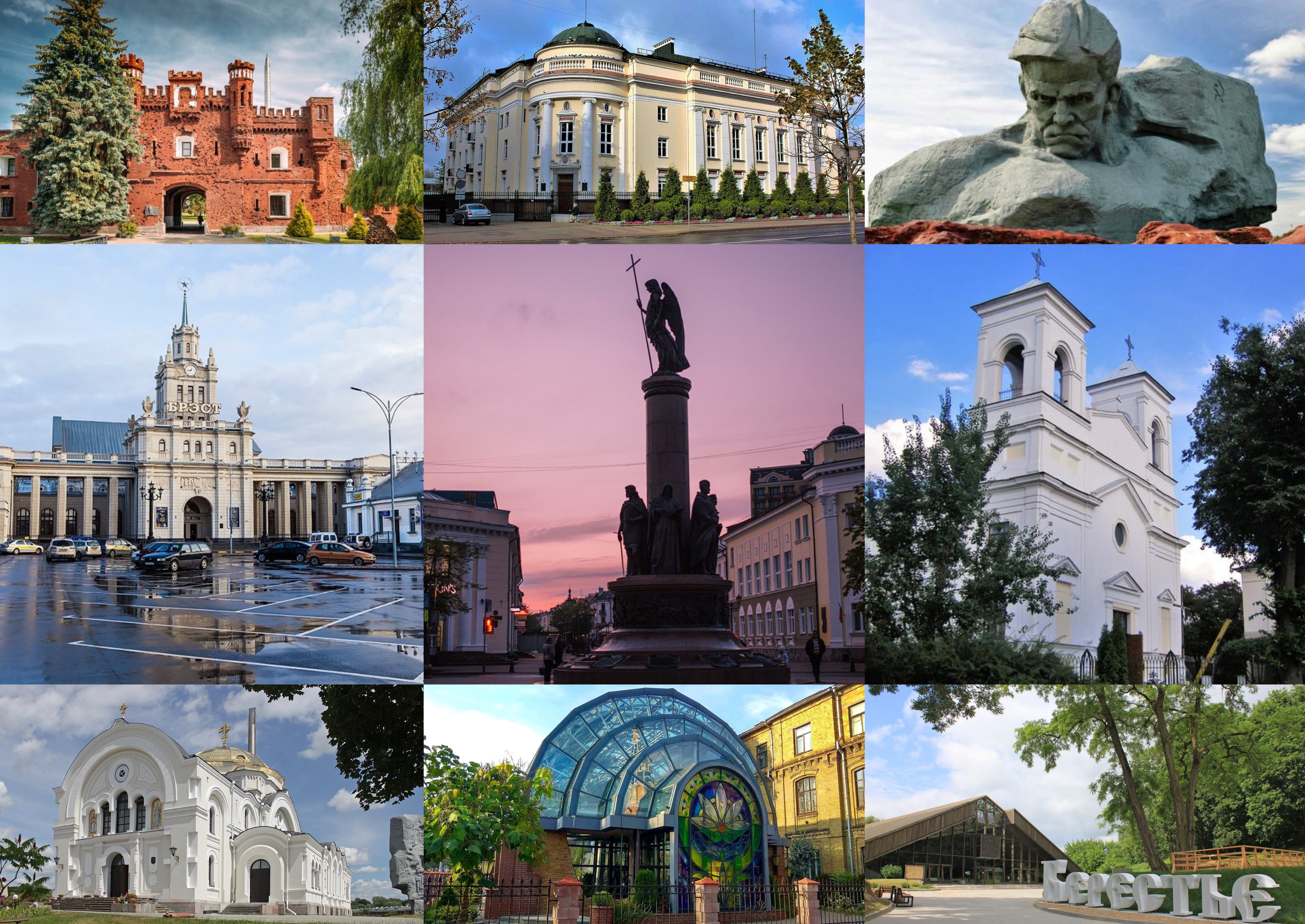

- Flag Coat of arms
- Interactive map of Brest
- Location within Belarus
- Coordinates: 52°08′05″N 23°39′25″E
- Country: Belarus
- Region: Brest Region
- First mentioned: 1019
- Magdeburg city rights: 1390

Government
  - Chairman of the Brest City Executive Committee: Siarhiej Labadzinski
  - Chairman of the Brest City Council of Deputies: Mikalaj Krasouski

Area
  - Total: 145 km^{2} (56 sq mi)
- Elevation: 280.4 m (920 ft)

Population (2026)
  - Total: 347,138
  - Density: 2,390/km^{2} (6,200/sq mi)
- Time zone: UTC+3 (MSK)
- Postal code: 224000
- Area code: +375 (0)162
- License plate: 1
- Website: city-brest.gov.by

Brest, (Note: Belarusian: Брэст [brɛst], locally: [beˈrɛsʲtʲ]; Russian: Брест [brʲest]; Ukrainian: Бере́стя, romanized: Berestia, [beˈrɛsʲtʲɐ]; Lithuanian: Brasta; Polish: Brześć [bʐɛɕt͡ɕ]; Yiddish: בריסק, romanized: Brisk.) formerly Brest-Litovsk (Note: Russian: Брест-Литовск, lit. 'Lithuanian Brest'; Taraškievica Belarusian: Берасьце Літоўскае, romanized: Bieraście Litoŭskaje; Lithuanian: Lietuvos Brasta; Polish: Brześć Litewski; Yiddish: בריסק דליטא.) (1600s–1923) and Brest-on-the-Bug (Note: Polish: Brześć nad Bugiem.) (1923–1939), is a city in south-western Belarus at the border with Poland opposite the Polish town of Terespol, where the Bug and Mukhavets rivers meet, making it a border town. It serves as the administrative center of Brest Region and Brest District, though it is administratively separated from the district. As of 2026, it has a population of 347,138.

Brest is one of the oldest cities in Belarus and a historical site for many cultures, as it hosted important historical events, such as the Union of Brest and Treaty of Brest-Litovsk. Furthermore, the Brest Fortress was recognized by the Soviet Union as a Hero Fortress in honour of the defense of Brest Fortress in June 1941.

In the High Middle Ages, the city often passed between Poland, the principalities of Kievan Rus', and the Grand Duchy of Lithuania. From the Late Middle Ages, the city was part of Lithuania, which later became a part of the Polish–Lithuanian Commonwealth from 1569. In 1795, it was incorporated into the Russian Empire with the Third Partition of Poland. After the Polish-Soviet War, the city became part of the Second Polish Republic. In 1939, the city was captured by Nazi Germany during the invasion of Poland and then transferred to the Soviet Union per the German–Soviet Frontier Treaty. In 1941, it was retaken by the Germans during Operation Barbarossa. In 1944, it was retaken by the Soviet Red Army during the Lublin–Brest offensive. The city was part of the Byelorussian SSR, and since the breakup of the Soviet Union in 1991, Brest has been part of independent Belarus.

== Etymology ==
Several theories attempt to explain the origin of the city's name. The name was first mentioned in the Primary Chronicle as Берестий (Berestiy); other variants of this traditional name included Бересте (Bereste) and Бересть (Berest'). The traditional name rendered in Belarusian is Берасце (Bieraście), which is still commonly used. The modern name in Ukrainian is Берестя (Berestia). The name could originate from Slavic root berest 'elm'. It could likewise have come from the Lithuanian word brasta 'ford'. The name Lietuvos Brasta was created by media in standard Lithuanian only at the turn of the 19th and 20th centuries.

Once a center of Jewish scholarship, the city has the Yiddish name בריסק (Brisk), hence the term "Brisker" used to describe followers of the influential Soloveitchik family of rabbis.

Brest became a part of the Grand Duchy of Lithuania in 1319. In the Polish–Lithuanian Commonwealth formed in 1569, the town became known in Polish as Brześć, historically Brześć Litewski (literally: "Lithuanian Brest", in contradistinction to Brześć Kujawski). Brześć became part of the Russian Empire under the name Brest-Litovsk or Brest-Litovskii (Russian: Брест-Литовск, Брест-Литовский, literally "Lithuanian Brest") in the course of the Third Partition of the Polish-Lithuanian Commonwealth in 1795. After World War I, and the rebirth of Poland in 1918, the government of the Second Polish Republic renamed the city as Brześć nad Bugiem ("Brest on the Bug") on 20 March 1923. After World War II, the city became part of the Byelorussian Soviet Socialist Republic with the name simplified as Brest.

Brest's coat of arms, adopted on 26 January 1991, features an arrow pointed upwards and a bow (both silver) on a sky-blue shield. An alternative coat of arms has a red shield. Sigismund II Augustus, King of Poland and Grand Duke of Lithuania, first granted Brest a coat of arms in 1554.

== History ==
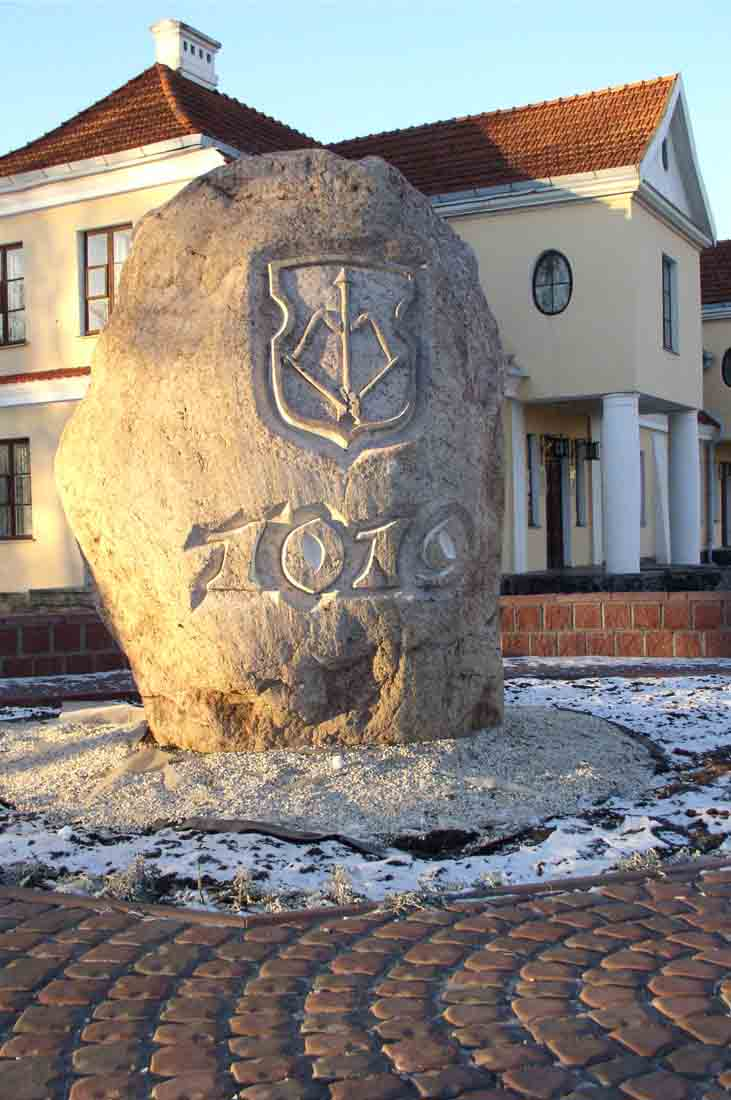
In 1019, Brest was first mentioned in chronicles as "Berestye"

As a town, Brest – Berestij in Kievan Rus – was first mentioned in the Primary Chronicle in 1019 when the Kievan Rus' took the stronghold from the Poles. It is one of the oldest cities in Belarus. It was hotly contested between the Polish rulers (kings, principal dukes and dukes of Masovia) and Kievan Rus princes. It was recaptured by Poland in 1020, and unsuccessfully besieged by Prince Yaroslav the Wise of Kiev in 1022. It was captured by Yaroslav the Wise, according to various sources, either in 1042 or 1044, then by 1076 recaptured by King Bolesław II the Bold of Poland, but then lost again by his successor Władysław I Herman. Afterwards, it often passed between the principalities of Turov and Volhynia. In 1164, it was briefly captured by Lithuanians. In 1178, it was captured by Casimir II the Just of Poland, and made the seat of his fraternal nephew Leszek, Duke of Masovia, who, however, soon lost it to the Principality of Minsk. In 1182, Casimir II the Just captured the city once again, and built a castle there, and then granted it as a fief to his sororal nephew Roman the Great the following year. From 1199 it was ruled by the Principality of Galicia–Volhynia, remaining under Polish suzerainty until 1205, when Roman the Great rebelled against Poland, but was killed in action in the Battle of Zawichost. Passing under Polish suzerainty again, in 1207, it was granted by Leszek the White as a fief to Princess Anna-Euphrosyne and her children. From 1210, it was directly part of Poland, until it passed to Galicia–Volhynia either in 1215 or 1217. In 1220, it passed to the Principality of Pinsk as a fief of Galicia–Volhynia. It was laid waste by the Mongols in 1241, and was not rebuilt until 1275. Possibly since the 1270s, the city was contested by the Grand Duchy of Lithuania and the Kingdom of Galicia–Volhynia.

=== Grand Duchy of Lithuania ===
In 1319, the city became part of the Grand Duchy of Lithuania, and Grand Duke Gediminas stayed in the city in the winter of 1319–1320, preparing to capture Kyiv. In 1349, it was captured by King Casimir III of Poland, however, it was restored to Lithuania in 1352. Its suburbs were burned by the Teutonic Order in 1379. In 1385, it became part of the Polish–Lithuanian union. During the Lithuanian Civil War (1389–1392), in 1390, the city was captured by Polish forces of Władysław II Jagiełło.

In 1390, Brześć became the second city in the Grand Duchy of Lithuania (after the capital Vilnius), and the first in the lands that now are Belarus, to receive Magdeburg rights. Given its proximity to Poland, it was a significant centre for trade with Poland.

In 1409 it was a meeting place of King Władysław II Jagiełło, Grand Duke Vytautas the Great and Khan Jalal al-Din Khan ibn Tokhtamysh under the Polish Deputy Chancellor Mikołaj Trąba's initiative, to prepare for war with the Teutonic Knights, which resulted in the Tatars aiding Poland and Lithuania in the Battle of Grunwald the following year. In 1410 the city mustered a cavalry banner that participated in the Polish-Lithuanian military victory at Grunwald.

In 1419 it became a seat of the starost in the newly created Trakai Voivodeship. Under Władysław II and Vytautas the city was significantly developed and granted privileges similar to those of the Polish city of Lublin. In 1425, the city hosted a congress attended by Władysław II, Vytautas, dukes of Masovia and Polish and Lithuanian nobles. In 1440, a Sejm of the Grand Duchy of Lithuania was held in the city, at which Casimir IV Jagiellon was chosen Grand Duke of Lithuania. In 1446, a meeting of Casimir IV, King of Poland and Grand Duke of Lithuania, and Polish senators regarding the political affiliation of Volhynia took place in the city, and in 1454 Casimir IV met with Lithuanian nobility to convince them to participate in the Polish–Teutonic War on the side of Poland.

=== Polish—Lithuanian Commonwealth ===
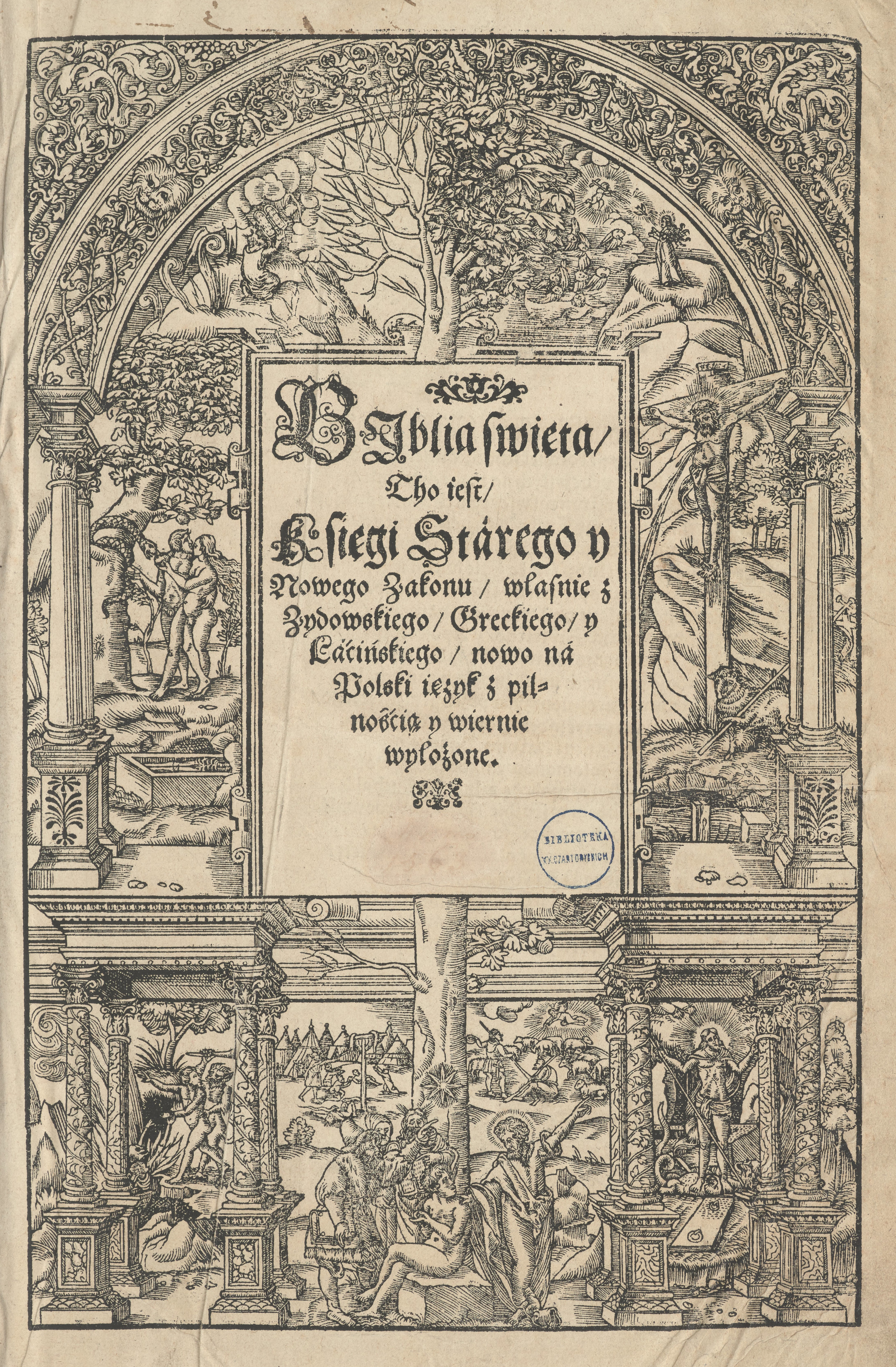
Brest Bible from 1563, the second complete Bible translation into Polish

In 1500, it was burned again by Crimean Tatars. From 1513, the city was administratively located in the Podlaskie Voivodeship. In 1563, the Brest Bible, the second complete Bible translation into Polish and the first such Protestant translation, was published in the city. In 1566, following the decree of Sigismund II Augustus, a new voivodeship was created – Brest Litovsk Voivodeship.

During the union of the Polish–Lithuanian Commonwealth and the Swedish Empire under king Sigismund III Vasa (Polish–Swedish union), diets were held there. In 1594 and 1596, it was the meeting-place of two remarkable councils of regional bishops of the Roman-Catholic Church and Eastern Orthodox Church. The 1596 council established the Uniate Church (also known as the Belarusian Greek Catholic Church in Belarus and Ukrainian Greek Catholic Church in Ukraine). A Sejm of the Polish–Lithuanian Commonwealth was held in the city in 1653. A royal mint was founded in the city by King John II Casimir Vasa in 1665.

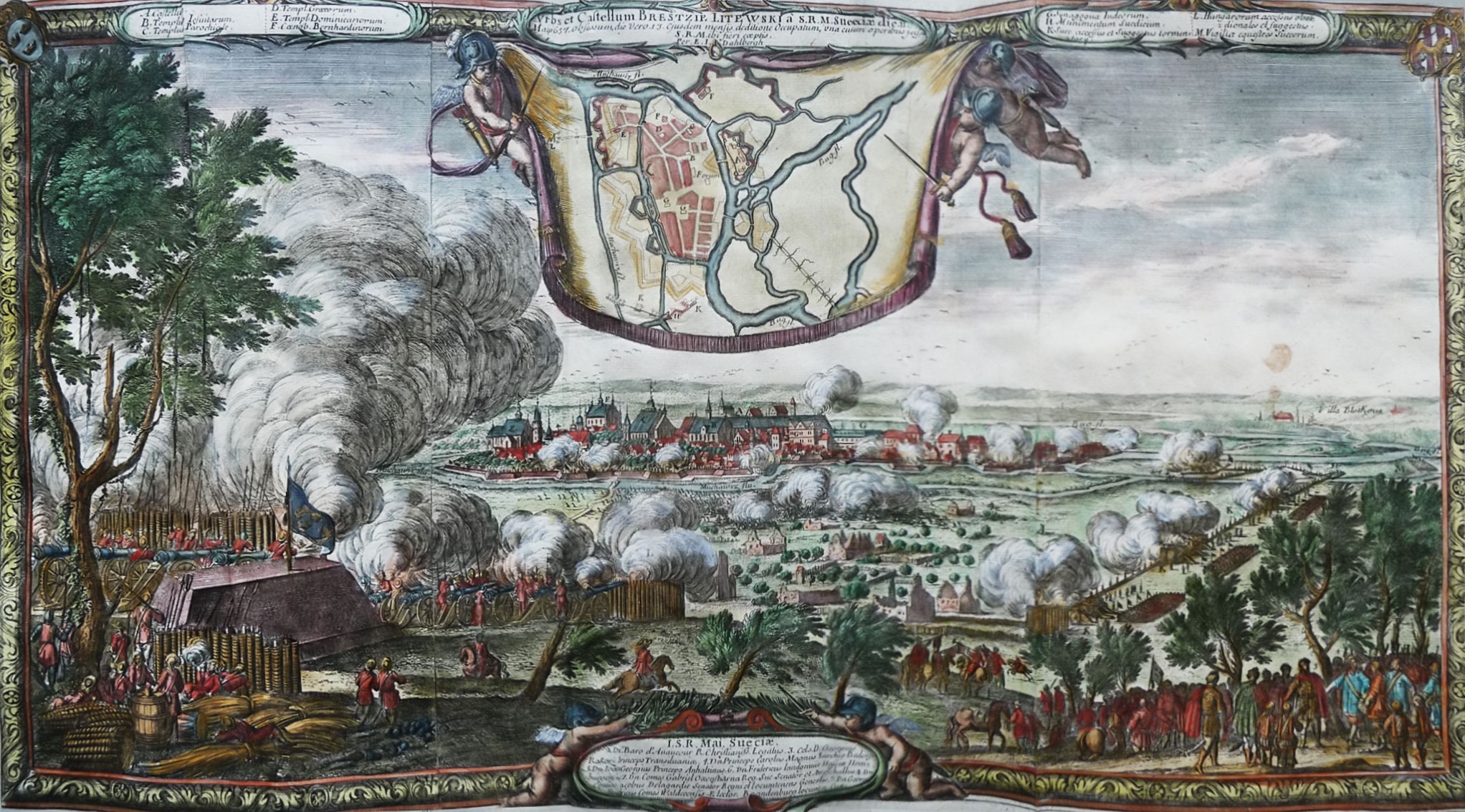
Siege of Brześć by E. Dahlbergh, 1657

In 1657, and again in 1706, the town and castle were captured by the Swedish Army during its invasions of the Polish-Lithuanian Commonwealth. Then, in an attack from the other direction, on 13 January 1660, the invading Streltsy of the Tsardom of Russia under Ivan Andreyevich Khovansky took the Brest Castle in an early morning surprise attack, the town having been captured earlier, and massacred the 1,700 defenders and their families (according to an Austrian observer, Captain Rosestein).

==== Partitions ====
On 23 July 1792, the defending Grand Ducal Lithuanian Army, under the leadership of Szymon Zabiełło, and the invading Imperial Russian Army fought a battle near Brześć. On 19 September 1794, the area between Brest and Terespol was the site of another battle won by the Russian invaders led by Alexander Suvorov over a Polish-Lithuanian division under General Karol Sierakowski. Thereafter, Brest was annexed by Russia when the Poland-Lithuania Commonwealth was partitioned for the third time in 1795.

=== 19th century to World War I ===
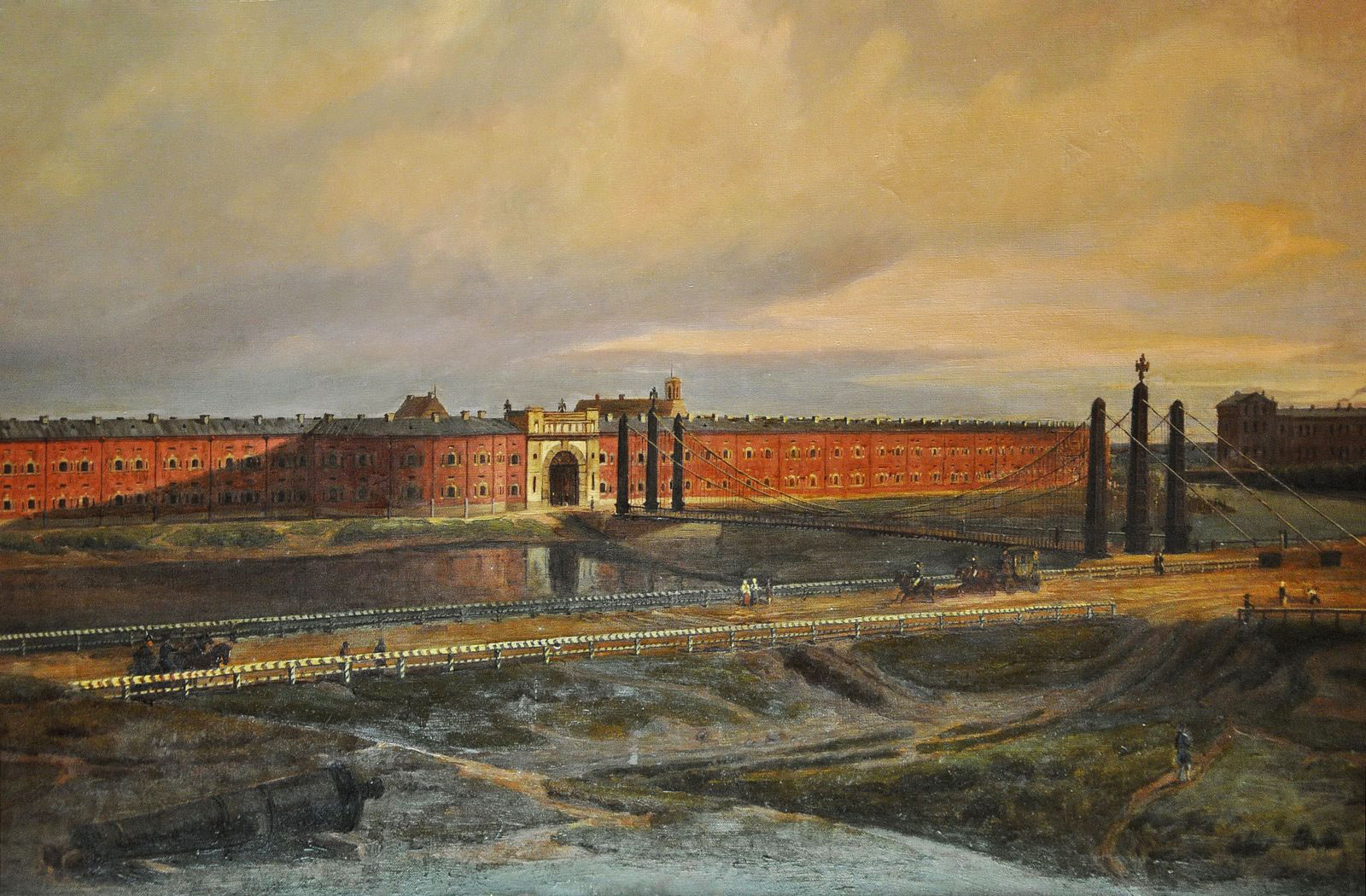
Brest Fortress on a painting by Marcin Zaleski from 1846

During Russian rule in the 19th century, Brest Fortress was built in and around the city. The Russians demolished the Polish Royal Castle and most of the Old Town "to make room" for the fortress. The main Jewish synagogue in the city, the Choral Synagogue, was completed c. 1862. In 1895, a massive fire rendered 15,000 people homeless, and dozens were killed. Because of the proximity of the fortress, only wooden buildings could be erected in the city; masonry construction was permitted only in exceptional cases and to a limited height. After the fire, more masonry buildings began to appear.

During World War I, the town was captured by the Imperial German Army under August von Mackensen on 25 August 1915, during the Great Retreat of 1915. Shortly after Brest fell into German hands, war poet August Stramm, who has been called "the first of the Expressionists" and one of "the most innovative poets of the First World War," was shot in the head during an attack on nearby Russian positions on 1 September 1915.

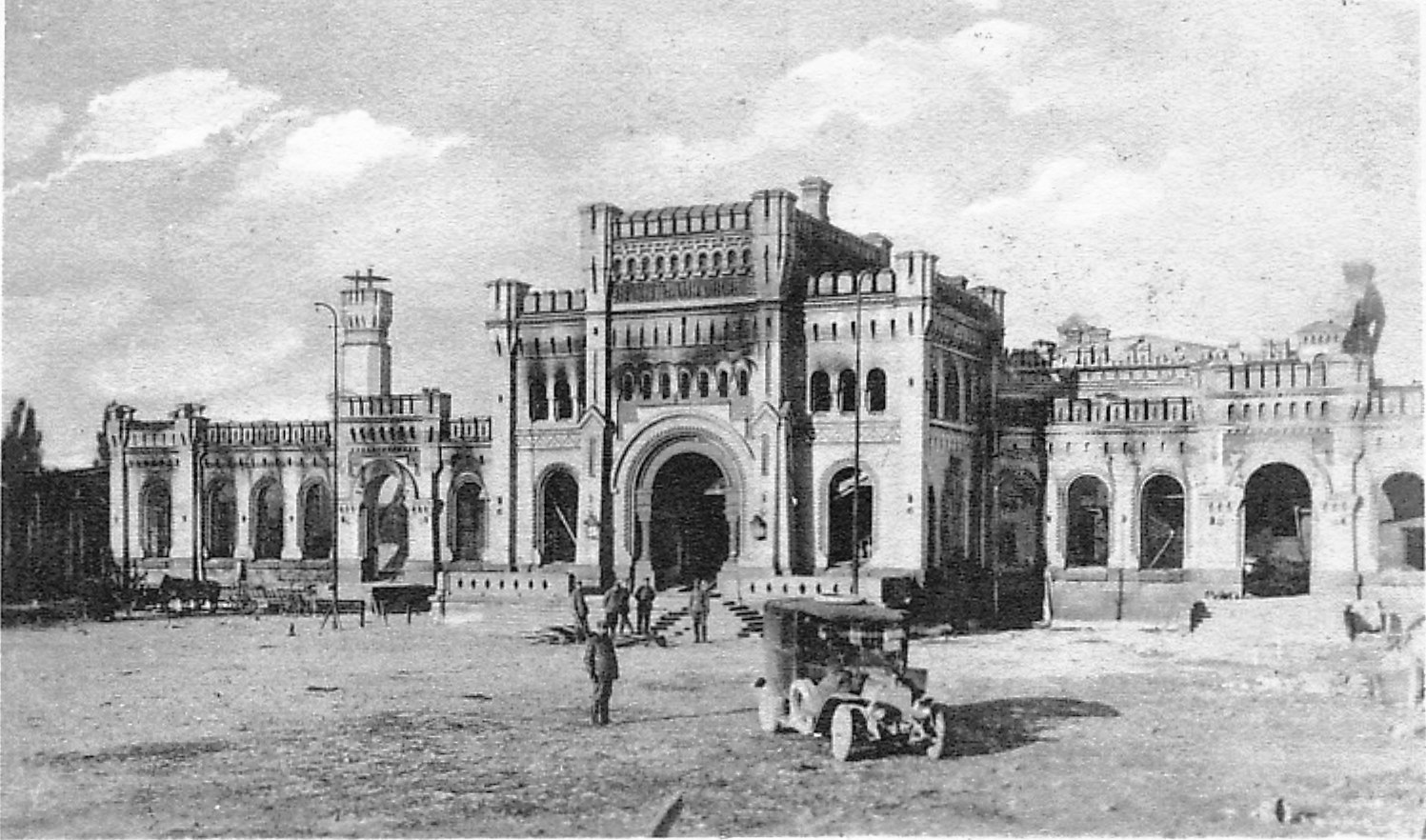
Brest railway station during World War I, c. 1915

In March 1918, in the Brest Fortress at the confluence of the Bug and Mukhavets rivers on the city' western outskirts, the Treaty of Brest-Litovsk was signed, ending the war between Soviet Russia and the Central Powers and transferring the city and its surrounding region to the sphere of influence of the German Empire. This treaty was subsequently annulled by the Paris Peace Conference treaties which ended the war and even more so by events and developments in Central and Eastern Europe. During 1918, the city became a part of the Volhynia Governorate of the Ukrainian People's Republic as a result of negotiations and own treaty between the delegation of the Ukrainian Central Rada and Central Powers.

=== Interwar Poland ===
On 9 February 1919, Polish troops entered the city, and it returned to Poland, which regained independence three months earlier. During the Polish–Soviet War it was occupied by the Soviet Russians on 1 August 1920, and recaptured by the Poles on 20 August, with borders formally recognized by the Treaty of Riga of 1921. In 1921, it became the temporary capital of the Polesie Voivodeship instead of Pińsk. It was renamed Brześć nad Bugiem (Brest on the Bug) on 20 March 1923.

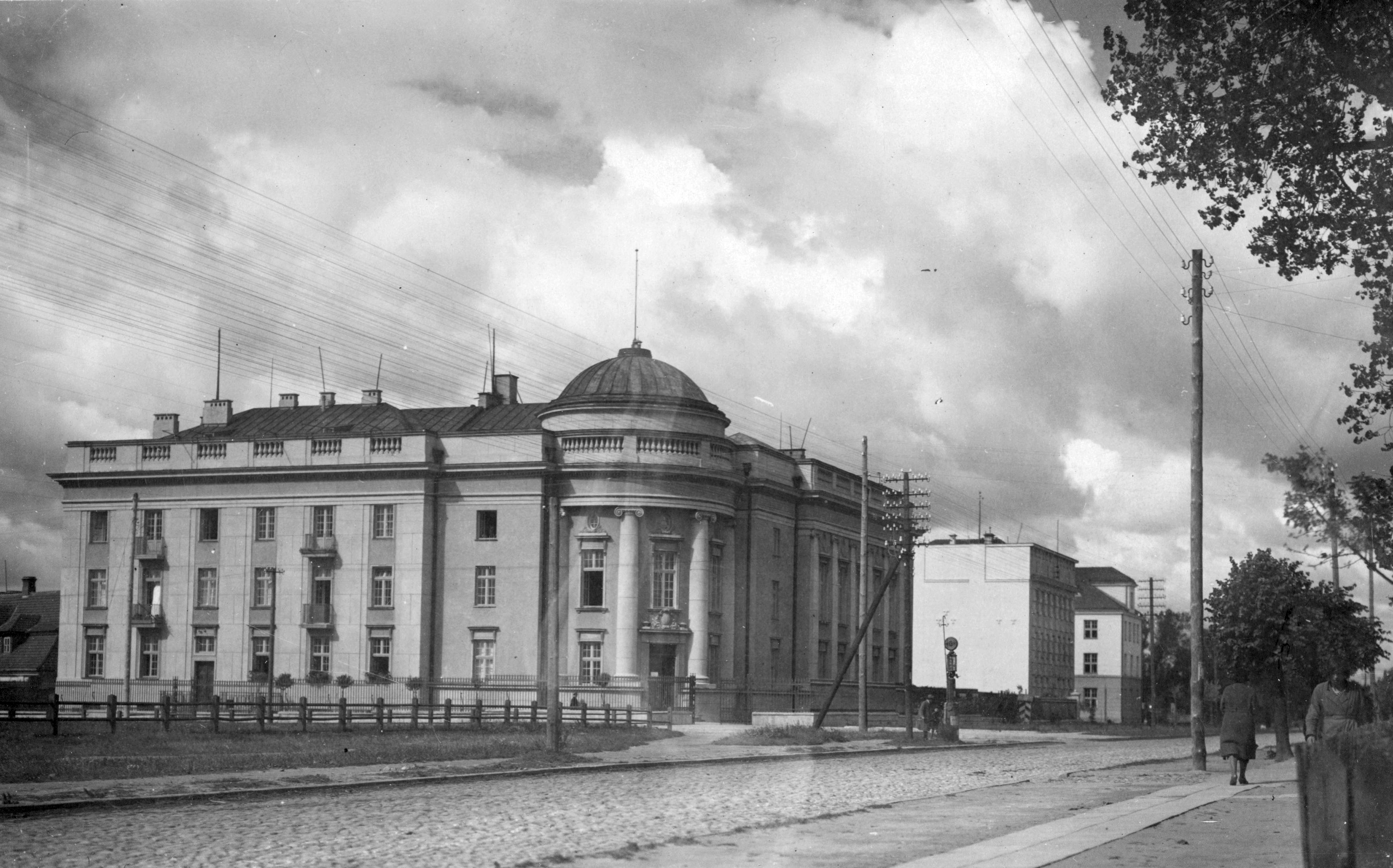
Bank of Poland between the wars

During World War I, the city was destroyed by 70% and required reconstruction. The city was developed significantly and a number of representative public buildings were erected in Neoclassical and Modernist styles, especially at Ulica Unii Lubelskiej (Union of Lublin Street, now Lenin Street), including the Bank of Poland, Tax Chamber, Regional Chamber of the State Control, Healthcare Fund and Voivodeship Office. Other notable projects include the officials' housing estate, stylistically inspired by historic manor houses of Polish nobility and the garden city movement, and the Warburg Residential Colony, dedicated to poor Jews who had lost their homes in World War I, founded by Felix M. Warburg, chairman of the Joint Distribution Committee of American Funds for Jewish War Sufferers. In 1929, city limits were greatly expanded.

In the twenty years of Poland's sovereignty, of the total of 36 brand new schools established in the city, there were ten public, and five private Jewish schools inaugurated, with Yiddish and Hebrew as the language of instruction. The first-ever Jewish school in Brześć history opened in 1920, almost immediately after Poland's return to independence. In 1936 Jews constituted 41.3% of the Brześć population or 21,518 citizens. Some 80.3% of private enterprises were run by Jews. The Polish Army troops of the 9th Military District along with its headquarters were stationed in Brześć Fortress.

The city had an overwhelmingly Jewish population during Russian rule: 30,000 out of 45,000 total population according to Russian 1897 census, which fell to 21,000 out of 50,000 according to the Polish census of 1931.

=== World War II ===
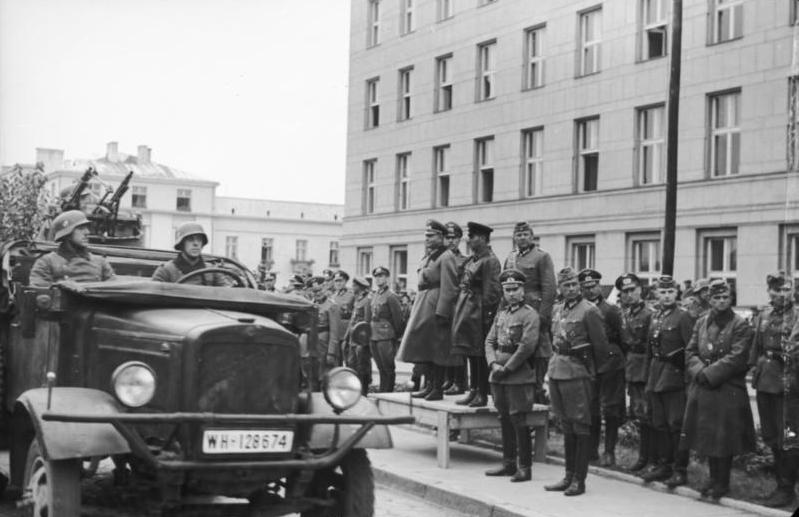
German–Soviet military parade in Brest-Litovsk at the conclusion of the Invasion of Poland. In the centre are Major General Heinz Guderian from the Wehrmacht and Brigadier Semyon Krivoshein from the Red Army.

In early September 1939, the Polish government evacuated a portion of the Polish gold reserve from Warsaw to Brześć, and then further southeast to Śniatyn at the Poland-Romania border, from where it was transported via Romania and Turkey to territory controlled by Polish-allied France.

During the German Invasion of Poland in 1939, the city was defended by a small garrison of four infantry battalions under General Konstanty Plisowski against General Heinz Guderian's XIX Panzer Corps. After four days of heavy fighting, the Polish forces withdrew southwards on 17 September. The Soviet invasion of Poland began on the same day. As a result, the Soviet Red Army entered the city at the end of September 1939 following the Molotov–Ribbentrop Pact's Secret Protocol, and a joint Nazi-Soviet military parade took place on 22 September 1939. While Belarusians consider it a reunification of the Belarusian nation under one constituency (the Byelorussian Soviet Socialist Republic at that time), Poles consider it the date when the city was lost.

During the Soviet occupation (1939–41), the Polish population was subject to arrests, executions and mass deportations to Siberia and the Kazakh Soviet Socialist Republic. The largest Soviet prison in the Byelorussian SSR was located in the city, and its prisoners were mostly Poles, including politicians, landowners, officers, educators, priests, both locals, including pre-war Polish mayor Franciszek Kolbusz, and people arrested in other places, including former Prime Minister of Poland Leopold Skulski, and Jews fleeing the Germans from western and central Poland. The prison had poor conditions, causing the spread of lice and bed bugs, and brutal interrogations, even resulting in two confirmed cases of suicide. In February 1940, there was a mass prison escape in which first 28 people managed to escape, and then Soviet soldiers opened fire on further escapees. Many prisoners were eventually moved to a prison in Minsk. It is suspected that they were murdered by the Soviets in the Katyn massacre in 1940.

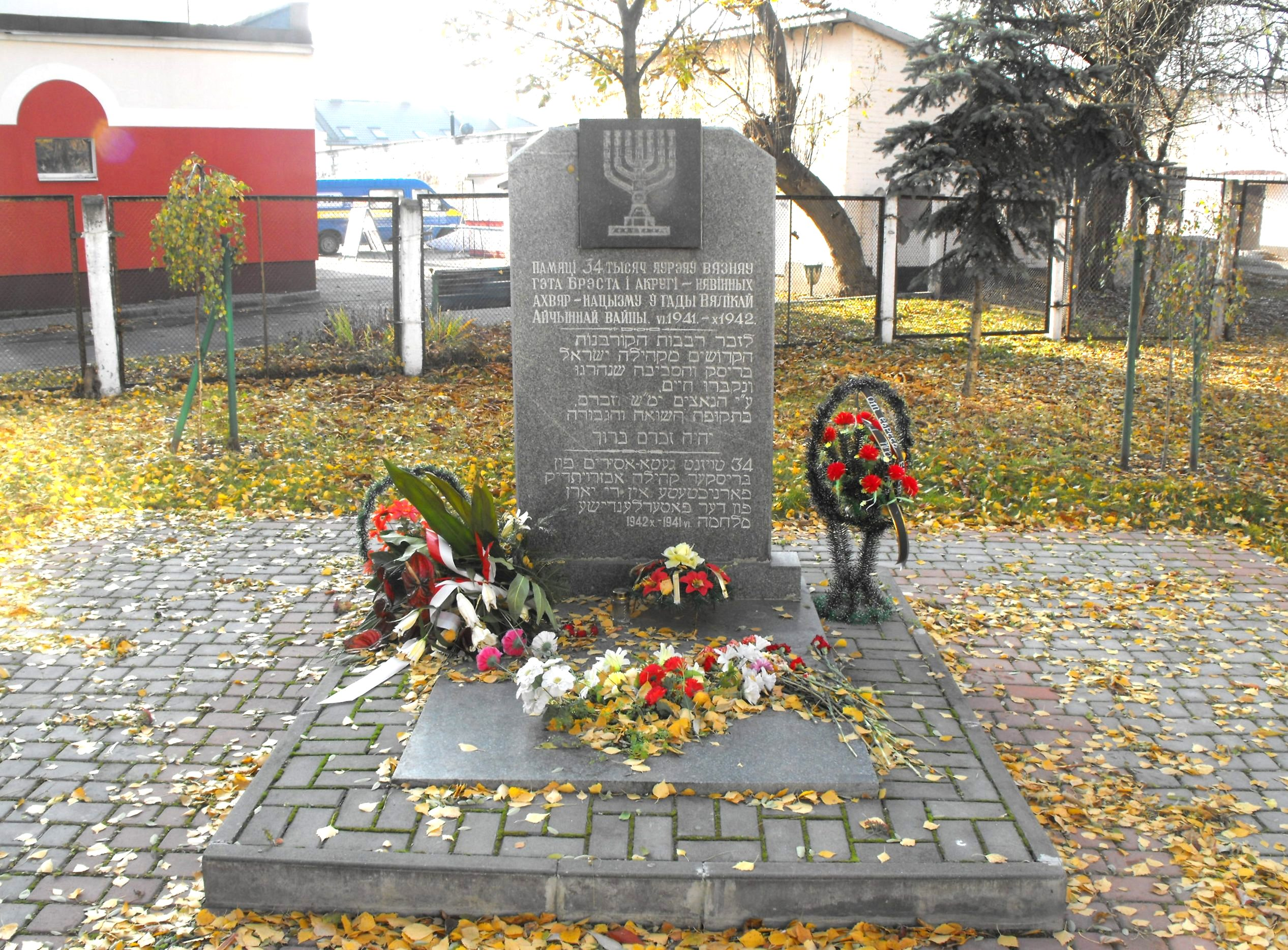
Holocaust memorial

On 22 June 1941, Brest Fortress and the city were attacked by Nazi Germany on the first day of Operation Barbarossa, Nazi Germany's invasion of the Soviet Union. The fortress held out for six days. Nearly all its Soviet army defenders perished. The Germans placed Brest under the administration of the Reichskommissariat Ukraine. The remaining municipal Jewish population (about 20,000) was sequestered in the Brześć Ghetto established by the German authorities in December 1941 and later murdered in October 1942. Only seven Jews survived the Nazi executions.

The Germans also operated a Nazi prison, a forced labour "education" camp for men and women, a forced labour camp for Jews, the AGSSt 3 prisoner-of-war assembly center, the Dulag 314 transit POW camp for Italians, the Stalag 397 POW camp for Soviet POWs and a subcamp of the Stalag 360 POW camp in the city.

The Polish resistance movement, including the Polesie District of the Home Army, was active in the city.

The city was re-occupied by the Red Army on 28 July 1944, and eventually annexed from Poland the following year.

=== Post-war period ===
In 1945, the Związek Obrońców Wolności ("Freedom Defenders Association") Polish resistance organization was founded in the city, with its activities including secret Polish schooling, rescuing historical Polish monuments from devastation and organising aid for repressed people and those in a difficult material situation. The organization was crushed by the NKVD in 1948, and its members were deported to Gulag forced labour camps for 25 years.

In early 2019, a mass grave containing the remains of 1,214 people were found in the Brest Ghetto area during a construction project. Most are believed to have been Jews murdered by Nazis.

== Geography ==
Brest lies astride the Mukhavets River which flows west through the city, dividing it into north and south, and meets the Bug River in the Brest Fortress. The river flows slowly and gently. Today the river looks quite broad in Brest. The terrain is fairly flat around Brest. The river has an extremely broad floodplain, that is about 2 to 3 kilometres (1 to 2 miles) across. Brest was subject to flooding in the past. One of the worst floods in recorded history occurred in 1974.

Part of the floodplain was reclaimed with hydraulic mining. In the 1980s, big cutter-suction dredgers mined sand and clay from the riverbed to build up the banks.

In the 2000s, two new residential areas were developed in the southwest of Brest.

To the east of Brest, the Dnieper–Bug Canal was built in the mid-nineteenth century to join the river to Pina, a tributary of the Pripyat River which in turn drains into the Dnieper. Thus Brest has a shipping route all the way to the Black Sea. If not for a dam and neglected weirs west of Brest, north-western European shipping would be connected with the Black Sea also.

== Climate ==
Brest has a humid continental climate but slightly leans towards oceanic due to the irregular winter temperatures that mostly hover around the freezing point. However, summers are warm and influenced by its inland position compared to areas nearer the Baltic Sea.

Climate data for Brest (1991–2020, extremes 1888–present)
Month	Jan	Feb	Mar	Apr	May	Jun	Jul	Aug	Sep	Oct	Nov	Dec	Year
Record high °C (°F)	15.9 (60.6)	17.2 (63.0)	24.7 (76.5)	30.7 (87.3)	34.3 (93.7)	38.7 (101.7)	36.6 (97.9)	37.6 (99.7)	34.4 (93.9)	26.4 (79.5)	19.0 (66.2)	14.5 (58.1)	38.7 (101.7)
Mean daily maximum °C (°F)	0.0 (32.0)	1.7 (35.1)	7.0 (44.6)	14.4 (57.9)	20.2 (68.4)	23.5 (74.3)	25.6 (78.1)	25.0 (77.0)	19.2 (66.6)	12.6 (54.7)	6.0 (42.8)	1.4 (34.5)	13.1 (55.6)
Daily mean °C (°F)	−2.3 (27.9)	−1.2 (29.8)	2.7 (36.9)	9.2 (48.6)	14.5 (58.1)	18.0 (64.4)	19.9 (67.8)	19.2 (66.6)	13.9 (57.0)	8.4 (47.1)	3.4 (38.1)	−0.8 (30.6)	8.7 (47.7)
Mean daily minimum °C (°F)	−4.5 (23.9)	−3.8 (25.2)	−0.8 (30.6)	4.3 (39.7)	9.1 (48.4)	12.6 (54.7)	14.7 (58.5)	13.9 (57.0)	9.4 (48.9)	5.0 (41.0)	1.2 (34.2)	−2.9 (26.8)	4.9 (40.8)
Record low °C (°F)	−35.5 (−31.9)	−28.1 (−18.6)	−22.6 (−8.7)	−6.2 (20.8)	−4.2 (24.4)	2.1 (35.8)	5.8 (42.4)	1.3 (34.3)	−2.8 (27.0)	−9.9 (14.2)	−19.2 (−2.6)	−25.1 (−13.2)	−35.5 (−31.9)
Average precipitation mm (inches)	36 (1.4)	35 (1.4)	33 (1.3)	39 (1.5)	67 (2.6)	68 (2.7)	83 (3.3)	62 (2.4)	56 (2.2)	42 (1.7)	39 (1.5)	40 (1.6)	600 (23.6)
Average extreme snow depth cm (inches)	6 (2.4)	7 (2.8)	3 (1.2)	0 (0)	0 (0)	0 (0)	0 (0)	0 (0)	0 (0)	0 (0)	1 (0.4)	4 (1.6)	7 (2.8)
Average rainy days	11	9	12	12	16	16	16	12	15	14	14	13	160
Average snowy days	16	16	10	3	0.1	0	0	0	0	1	7	14	67
Average relative humidity (%)	85	82	75	66	66	69	70	71	78	81	86	87	76
Mean monthly sunshine hours	43.3	64.6	139.4	198.6	267.9	282.1	284.7	268.0	182.4	119.6	49.1	35.8	1,935.5
Percentage possible sunshine	19	25	36	42	51	52	52	54	45	36	18	14	41
Source 1: Pogoda.ru.net
Source 2: NOAA, Belarus Department of Hydrometeorology (percent sun from 1949–1951 and 1953–2000)

== Demographics ==
Historical population

Year	Pop.	±%
1897	46,568	—
1939	41,400	−11.1%
1959	73,614	+77.8%
1970	121,629	+65.2%
1979	177,249	+45.7%
1989	258,016	+45.6%

Year	Pop.	±%
1999	286,400	+11.0%
2009	309,764	+8.2%
2019	338,979	+9.4%
2024	344,470	+1.6%
2025	346,061	+0.5%
2026	347,138	+0.3%

Source: pop-stat.mashke.org

== Points of interest ==
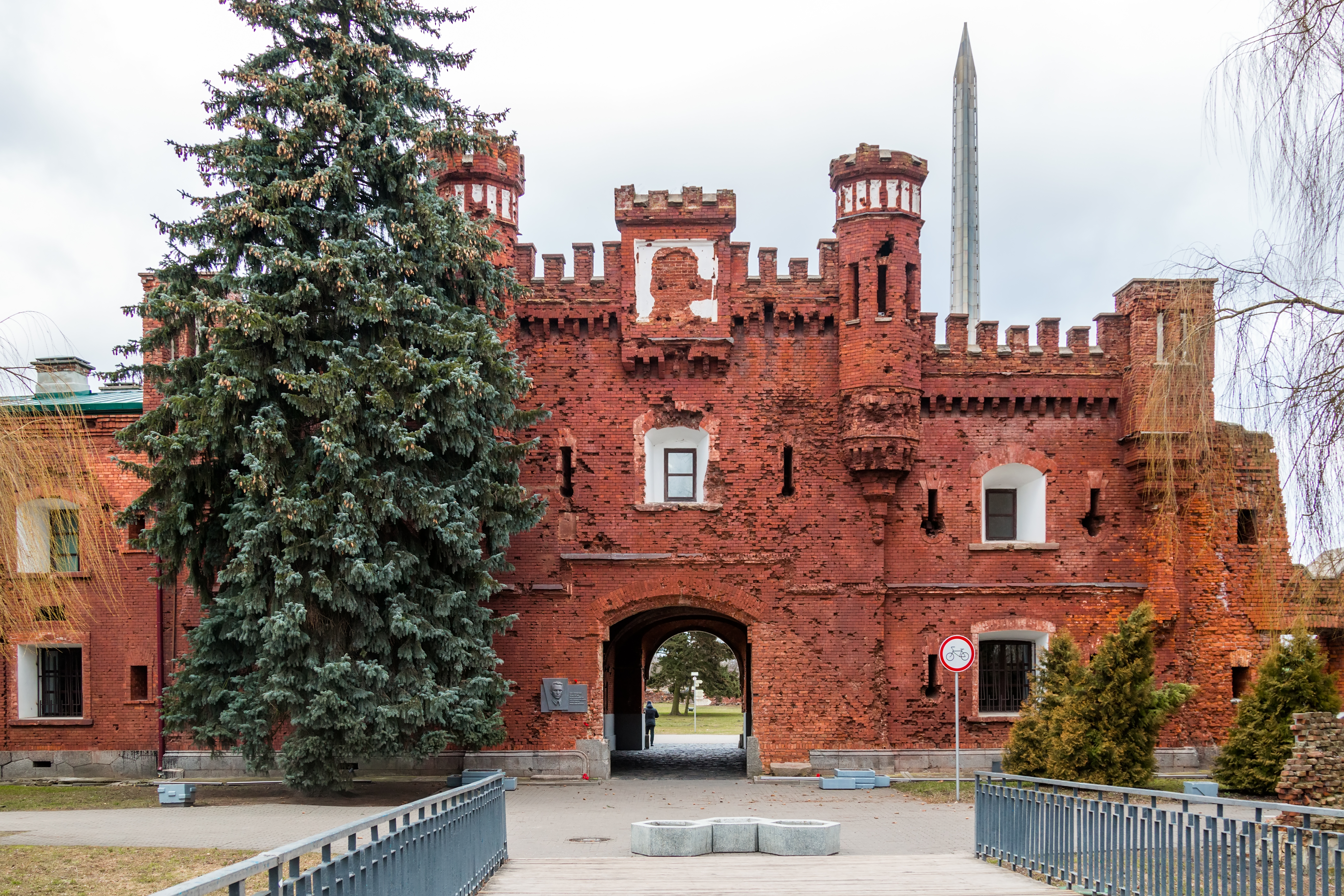
Brest Fortress

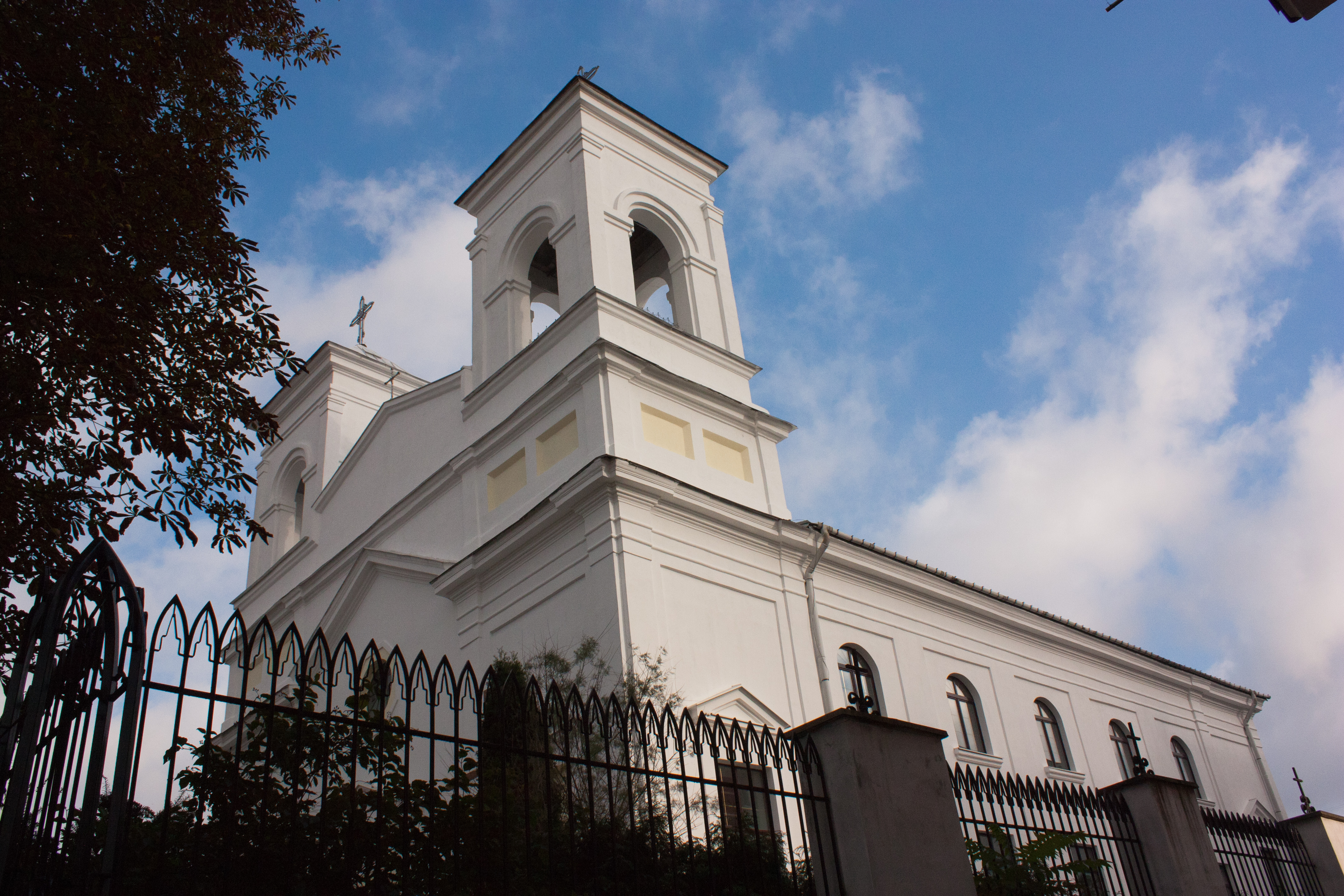
Church of the Exaltation of the Holy Cross

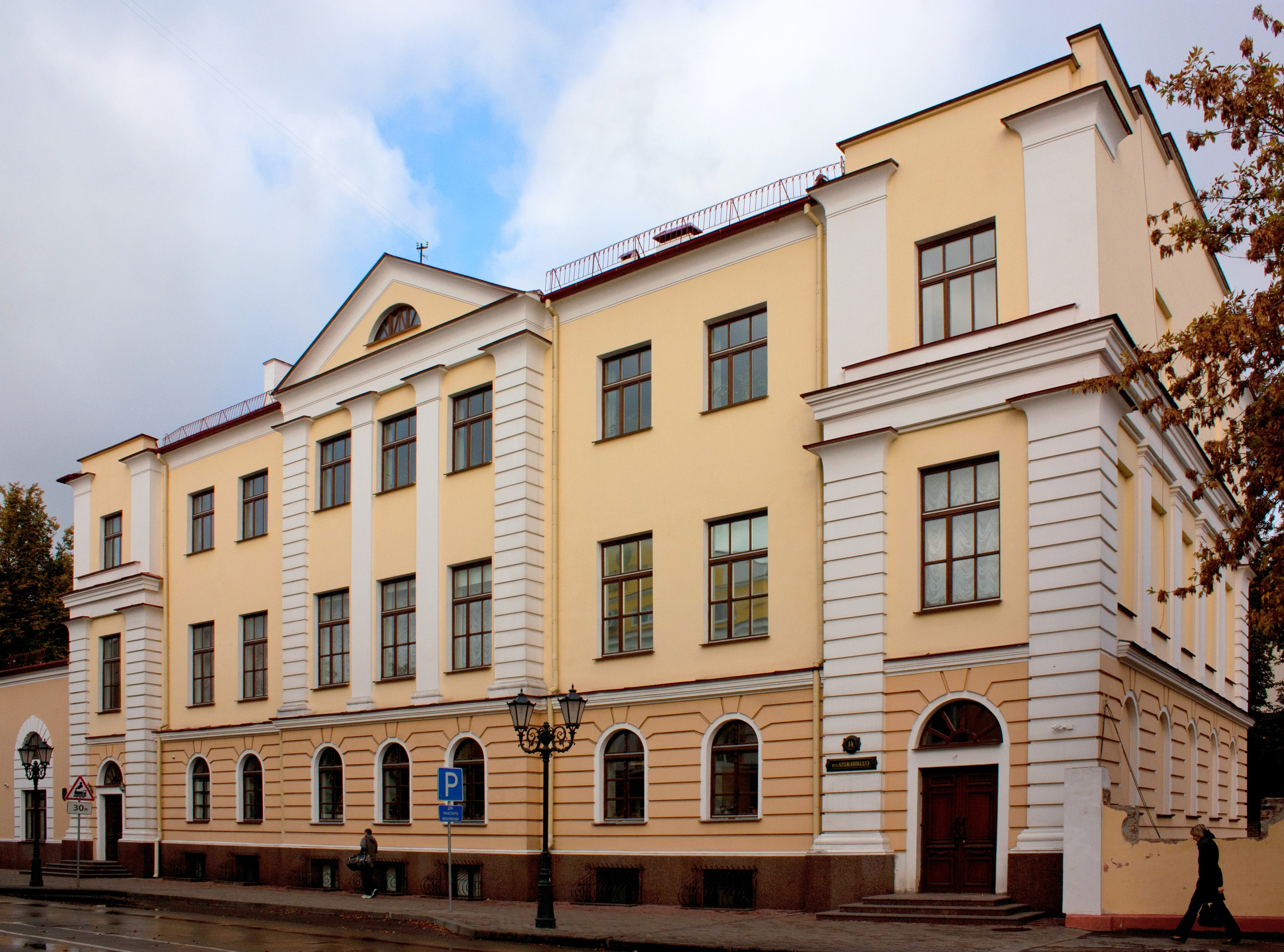
Brest Regional Philharmonic

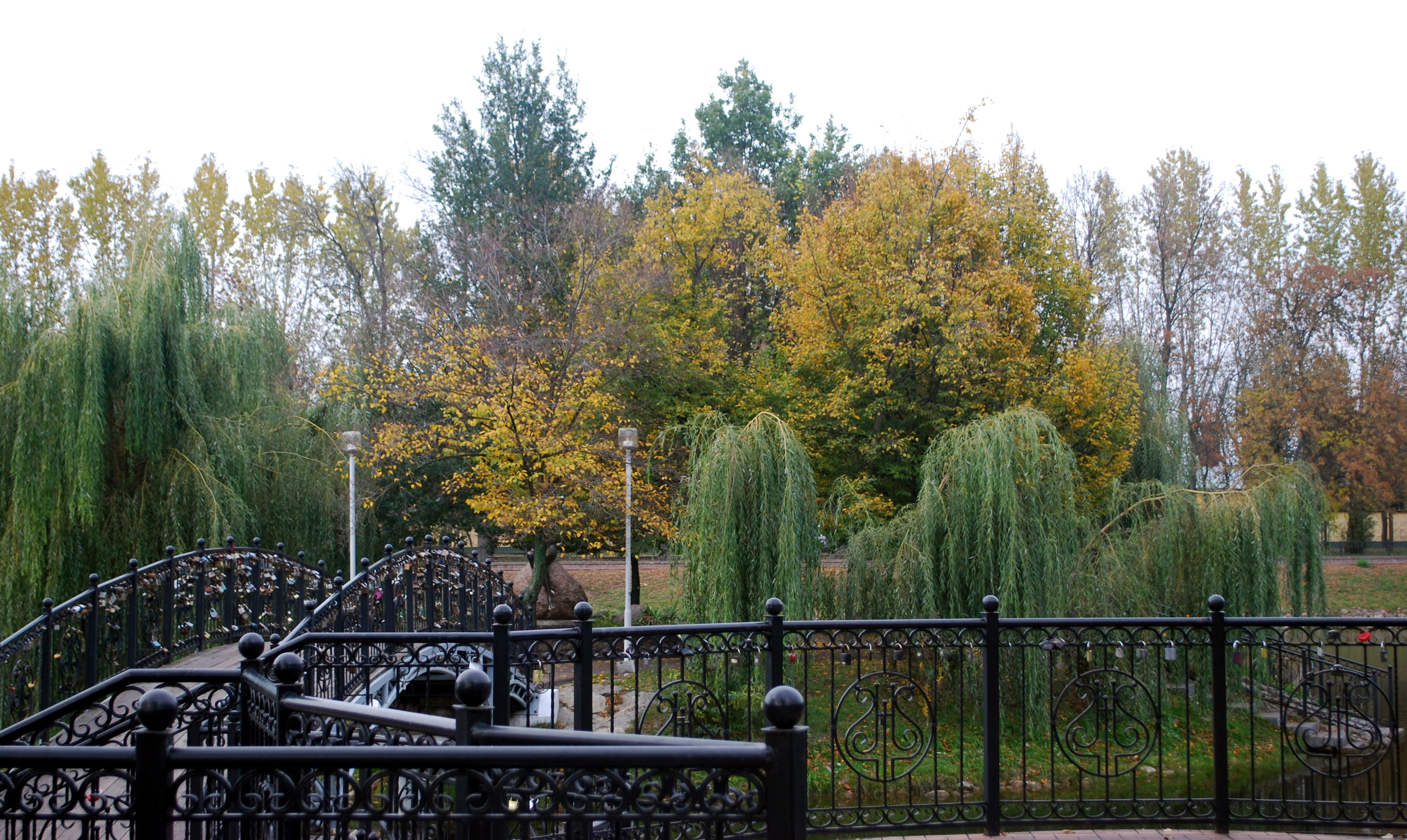
Brest City Park

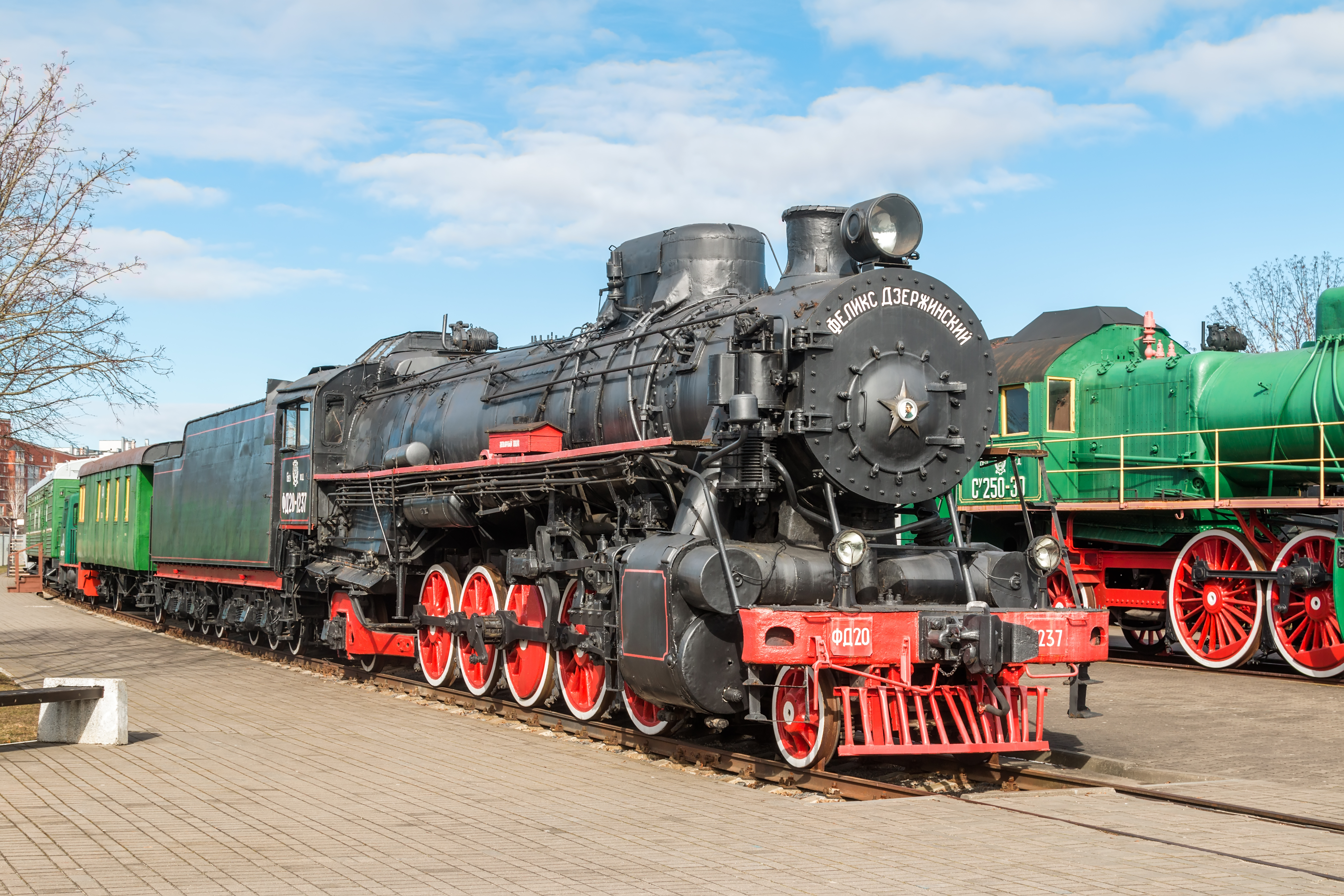
Brest Railway Museum

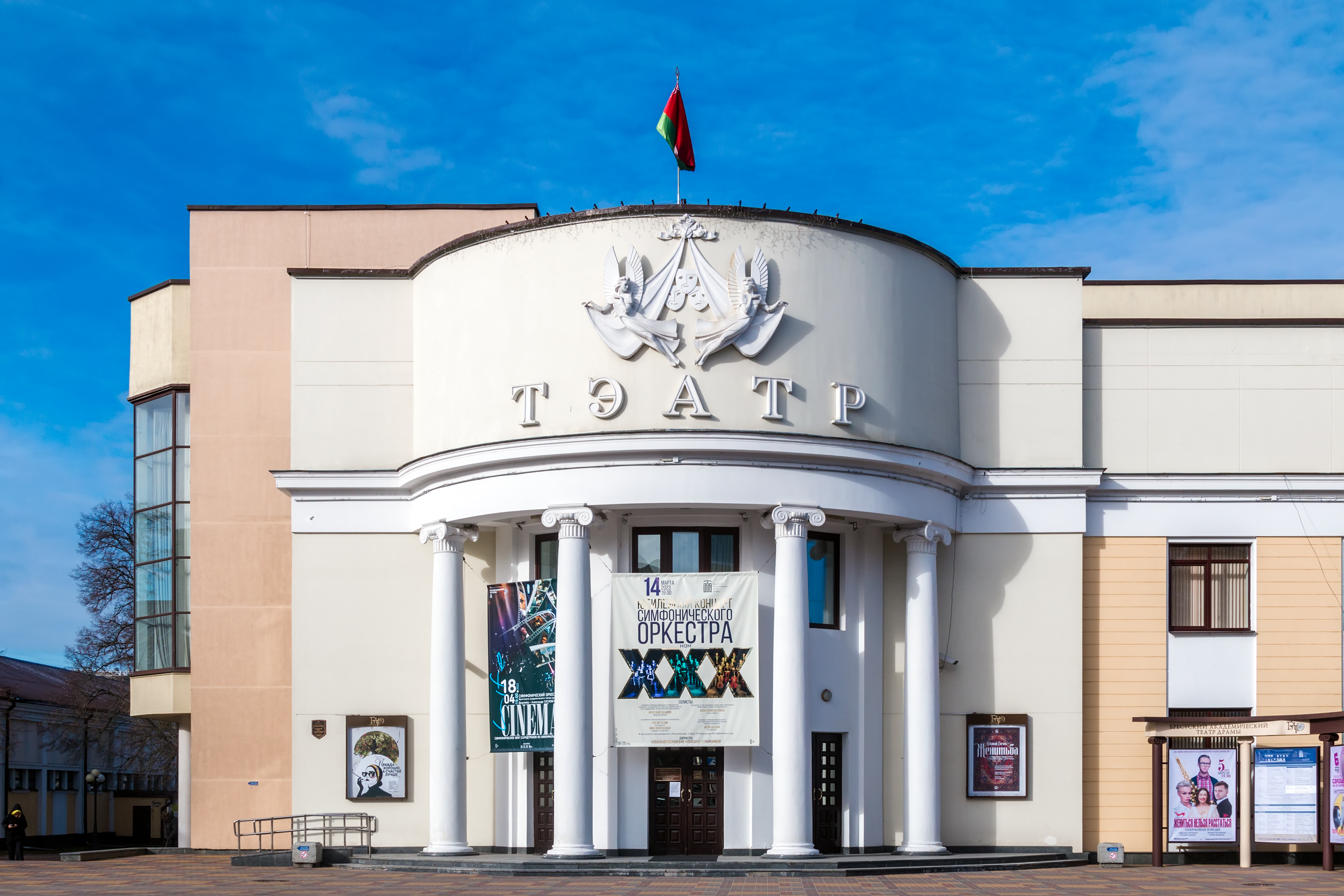
Academic Drama Theatre

A majestic Soviet-era war memorial was constructed on the site of the 1941 battle to commemorate the known and unknown defenders of the Brest Fortress. This war memorial is the largest tourist attraction in the city. The Berestye Archeological Museum of the old city is located on the southern island of the Hero-Fortress. It has objects and huts dating from the 11th – 13th century that were unearthed during the 1970s.

The Museum of Rescued Art Treasures has a collection of paintings and icons. Brest City Park is over 100 years old and underwent renovations from 2004 to 2006 as part of a ceremony marking the park's centennial. In July 2009, the Millennium Monument of Brest was unveiled. Sovetskaya Street is a popular tourist destination in Brest; it was dramatically reconstructed in 2007–2009. Other important landmarks include the Brest Railway Museum.

== Education ==
Brest is home to two universities: A.S. Pushkin Brest State University and Brest State Technical University. There is also a branch of Belarusian National Technical University.

Among the secondary specialized educational institutions of the city:

- Brest State Railway College
- Brest State Medical College
- Brest State Musical College named after G. Shirmy
- Brest State Regional College of the Olympic Reserve
- Brest State Polytechnic College - a branch of the Brest State Technical University
- Brest State Professional-Technical College of Instrument Engineering
- Brest State College of Transport and Service
- Brest State College of Light Industry
- Brest State College of Builders
- Brest State Trade and Technology College
- Brest State College of Communications
- Brest State College of Service Industry
- Brest branch of the capital's private educational institution "College of Business and Law."

== Transport ==
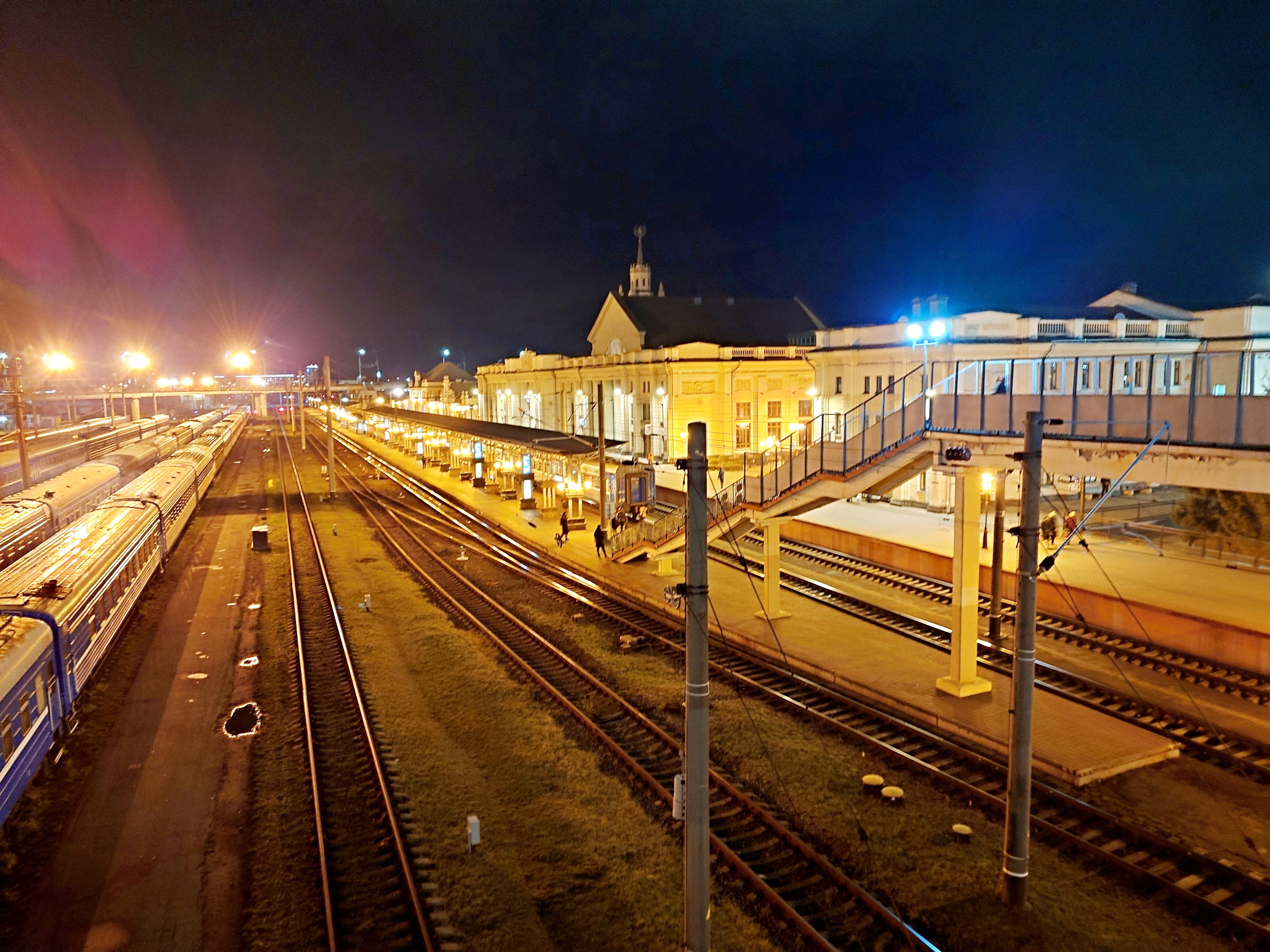
Main railway station

Being situated on the main railway line connecting Berlin and Moscow, and a transcontinental highway (the M1 highway is part of the European route E30 running from Cork to Omsk, where it links with Asian Highway 6 leading to Busan), Brest became a principal border crossing out of the Soviet Union in the postwar era. Today it links the European Union and the Commonwealth of Independent States.

The city of Brest is served by Brest-Tsentralny railway station. Because of the break-of-gauge at Brest, where the Russian broad gauge meets the European standard gauge, all passenger trains, coming from Poland, must have their bogies replaced here, to travel on across Belarus. The freight must be transloaded from cars of one gauge to cars of another. Some of the land in the Brest rail yards remains contaminated due to the transhipment of radioactive materials here since Soviet days. However, cleanup operations have been taking place.

The local airport, Brest Airport (code BQT), operates seasonal flights to Kaliningrad in the Russian Federation and seasonal charter flights to Burgas and Antalya.

== Sport ==
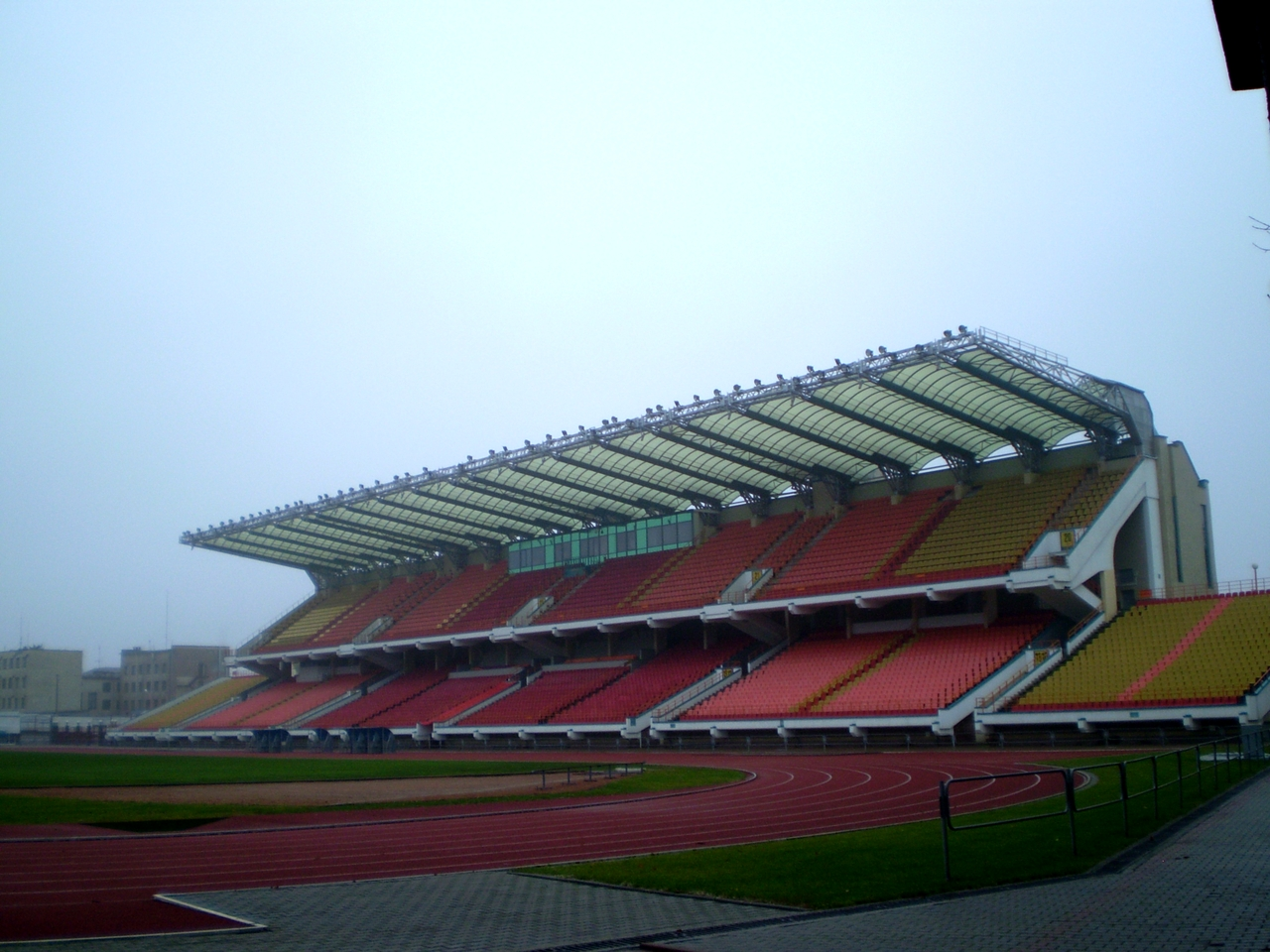
Regional Sport Complex Brestsky, Brest's largest stadium

HC Meshkov Brest won the Belarusian Men's Handball Championship from 2004-2008, 2014-2024, and in 2026.

There is a women's handball club in Brest – HC Victoria-Berestie.

HK Brest of the Belarusian Extraleague are the local pro hockey team.

FC Dynamo Brest is a local football club playing in the Belarusian Premier League.

The sports venues are located on the northern riverside on the hydraulic fill, consisting of an indoor track-and-field centre, the Brest Ice Rink, and Belarus' first outdoor baseball stadium. On the opposite riverside is a large rowing course opened in 2007, home of the National Center for Olympic Training in Rowing. It meets international requirements and can host international competitions. Moreover, it has accommodation and training facilities, favourable location, 3 kilometres (2 miles) away from the border crossing along Warsaw Highway (the European route E30).

== Media ==
There are some newspapers in Brest: Brestskaya Gazeta, Brestskiy Kurier, Vecherniy Brest.

== International relations ==
=== Sister cities ===
Sister cities of Brest include:

- Astrakhan, Russia
- Dorogomilovo District (Moscow), Russia
- Izhevsk, Russia
- Kaliningrad, Russia
- Kovrov, Russia
- Malgobek, Russia
- Nevsky District (Saint Petersburg), Russia
- Nizhny Tagil, Russia
- Novorossiysk, Russia
- Oryol, Russia
- Petrozavodsk, Russia
- Ryazan, Russia
- Tyumen, Russia
- Ivano-Frankivsk, Ukraine
- Lutsk, Ukraine
- Odesa, Ukraine
- Siedlce County, Poland
- Terespol, Poland
- Baienfurt, Germany
- Baindt, Germany
- Berg, Germany
- Ravensburg, Germany
- Weingarten, Germany
- Baiyin, China
- Xiaogan, China
- (Georgia (country)) Batumi, Georgia
- Nakhchivan, Azerbaijan
- Coevorden, Netherlands
- Port-sur-Saône, France
- Subotica, Serbia

Former twin towns:

- Biała Podlaska, Poland

In March 2022, the Polish city of Biała Podlaska suspended its partnership with Brest as a reaction to the Belarusian involvement in the 2022 Russian invasion of Ukraine.

=== Other forms of cooperation ===
Brest maintains partnership with:

- Ashdod, Israel
- Botoșani, Romania
- Brest, France
- Ludza, Latvia
- Maldon, England, United Kingdom
- Pleven, Bulgaria

== Honours ==
A minor planet, 3232 Brest, discovered by the Soviet astronomer Lyudmila Ivanovna Chernykh in 1974, is named after the city.

== Notable people ==
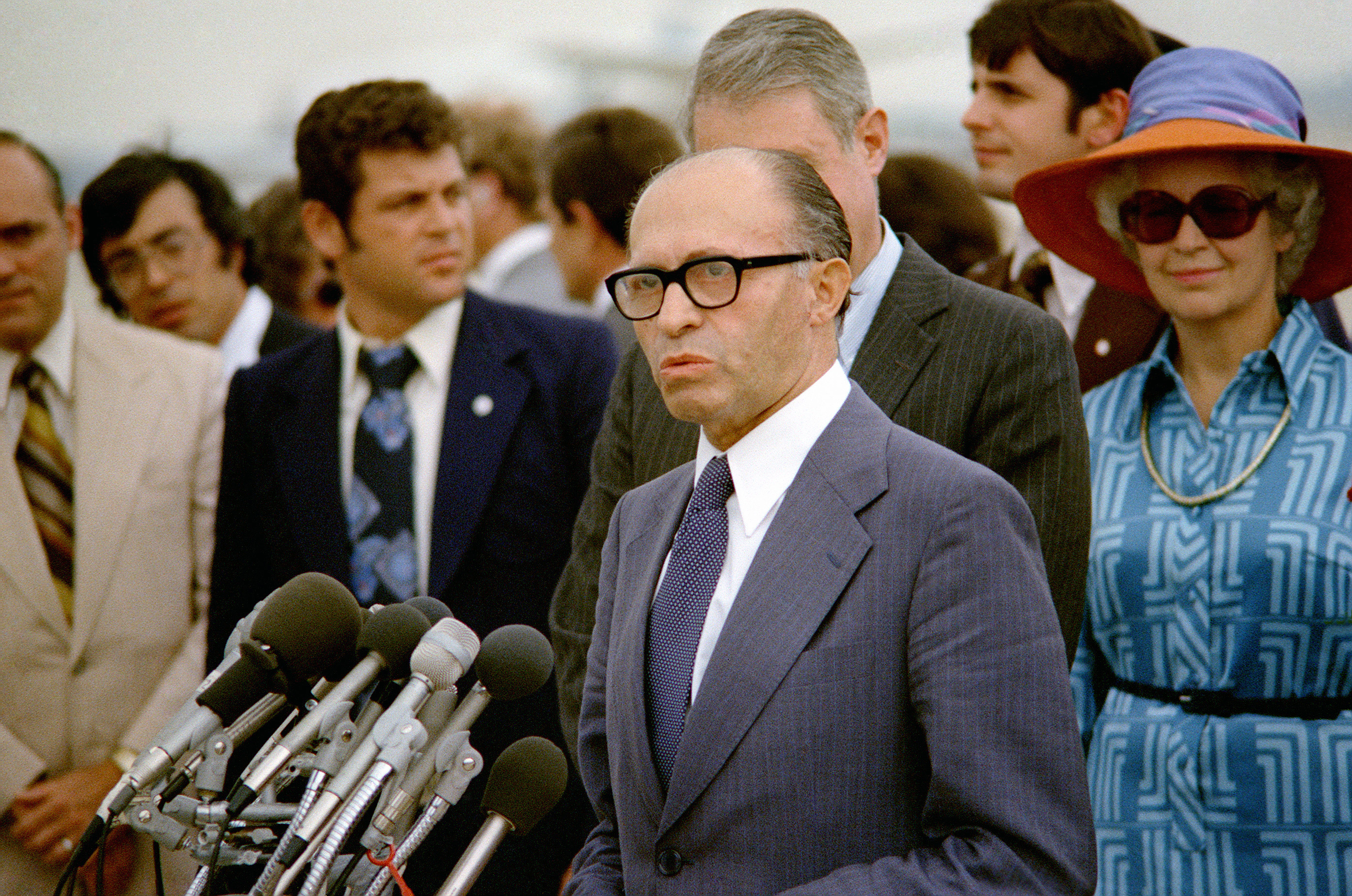
Menachem Begin

- Rabbi Yehoshua Leib Diskin, Rabbi of Brisk
- Menachem Begin (1913–1992), Prime Minister of Israel
- Liubov Charkashyna, Belarusian bronze medallist in the individual all-around rhythmic gymnastics competition at the 2012 Summer Olympics
- Aliaksandar Cvikievič (1888 – 1937), Belarusian politician, historian, jurist, philosopher and a victim of Stalin's purges
- Jarosław Dąbrowski, Polish revolutionary and general
- David Dubinsky, head of the International Ladies Garment Workers' Union
- Andrej Dyńko (b. 1974), journalist and editor
- Louis Gruenberg, composer
- Nikolay Karpol, Russian women's volleyball coach
- Jerzy Kolendo, Polish classical archaeologist and historian
- Harry Kopp (1880–1943), American lawyer and politician
- Pyotr Masherov, secretary of Belarusian committee of the Communist Party of Soviet Union
- Yulia Nesterenko, Olympian women's 100 m champion
- Dzmitryj Rubašeŭski (nom de guerre (“Hans”))(1992-2022), Belarusian volunteer killed in action defending Ukraine during the 2022 Russian invasion
- Nathan Sharon (1925–2011), Israeli biochemist, expert on lectins
- Hienadz Shutau (1975 – 2020), a protestor killed during the protests against the 2020 Belarusian presidential election
- The Soloveitchik rabbinical family associated with the Brisk yeshivas, and descendant Rabbi Yoseph Soloveitchik
- David B. Steinman, American structural engineer; the designer of the Mackinac Bridge called "Big Mac"
- Nadzeja Sznarkiewicz (1897–1974), feminist writer and teacher
- Rabbi Aaron ben Meir of Brest, eighteenth-century rabbi
- Rabbi Aharon Leib Shteinman, haredi rabbi in Israel
- Sara Szweber, Bundist
- Ganna Walska, Polish opera singer

== See also ==
- Names of European cities in different languages: B

== Bibliography ==
- Pszczółkowski, Michał (2014). "Architektura Brześcia nad Bugiem w latach II Rzeczypospolitej". Kwartalnik Architektury i Urbanistyki (in Polish and English). Vol. 59, no. 3. Translated by Pszczółkowska, Karolina. Komitet Architektury i Urbanistyki Polskiej Akademii Nauk. ISSN 0023-5865.
- Mondalski, Wiktor (1929). Brześć Podlaski (Brześć Litewski, Brześć nad Bugiem). Zarys geograficzno-historyczny (in Polish). Turek.
