= Berestye Archeological Museum =

Berestye
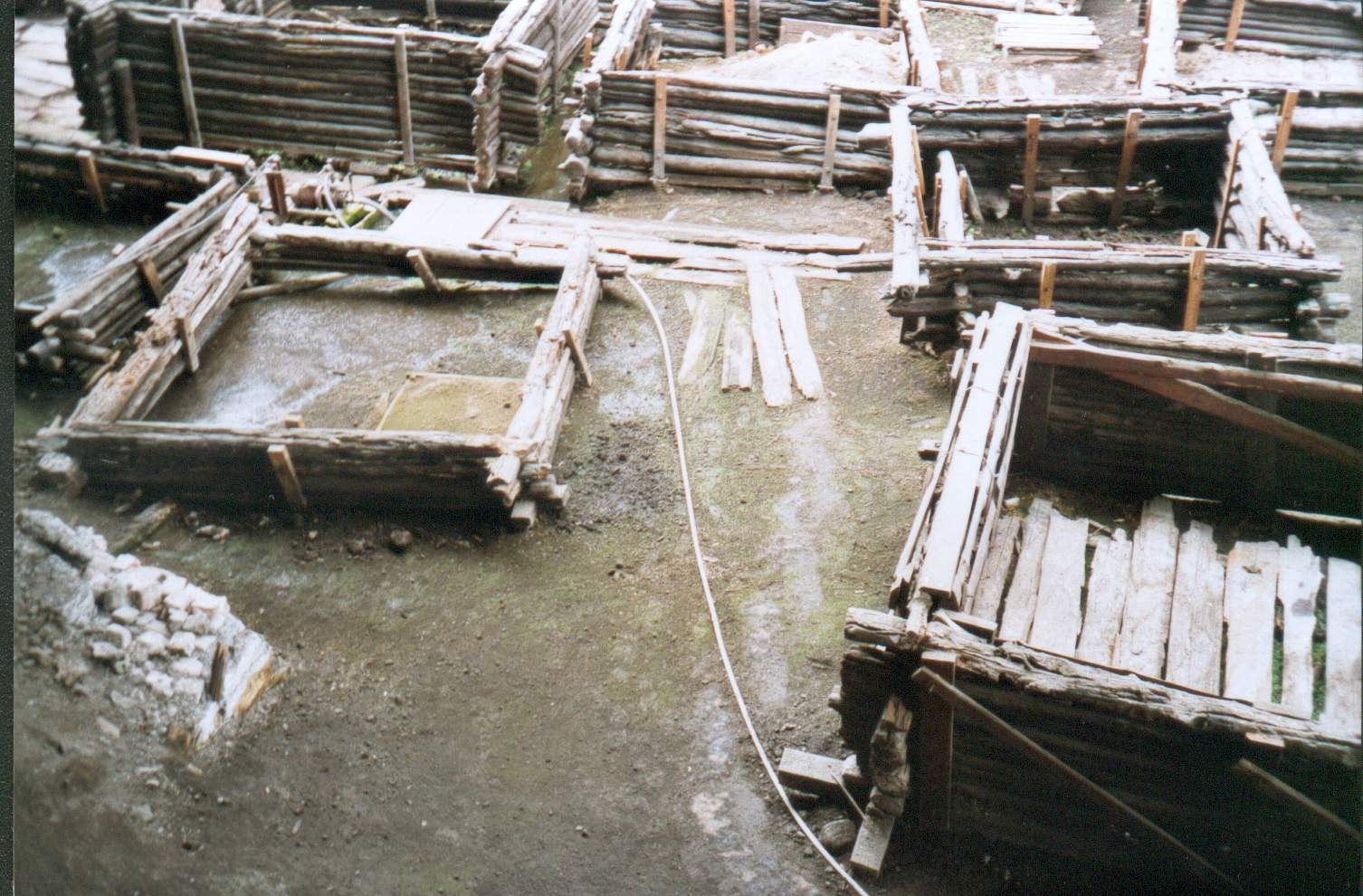
- Established: 1982
- Location: Brest, Belarus
- Coordinates: 52.079962°N 23.654746°E
- Collection size: 43 thousand objects
- Website: Berestye Archeological Museum

The Berestye Archeological Museum, located in the city of Brest, Belarus, is a museum centered around an archaeological site displaying an authentic East Slavic wooden town dating back to the 13th century. Unique in Europe, the 1800 square meter site was excavated by archeologists of the Belarusian Academy of Sciences between 1968 and 1981. The project was supervised by Dr. P.F.Lysenko. In 1982, a modern structure of concrete, glass and aluminum in the shape of a huge pitched roof was erected over the archeological site. The museum was opened on March 2, 1982. The museum displays preserved 28 log cabins, as well over 1400 artifacts dating back to 10th and 14th centuries which were unearthed during the excavation.
