= Pyotr Lysenko =

Belarusian archaeologist (1931–2020)

Pyotr Fyodorovich Lysenko
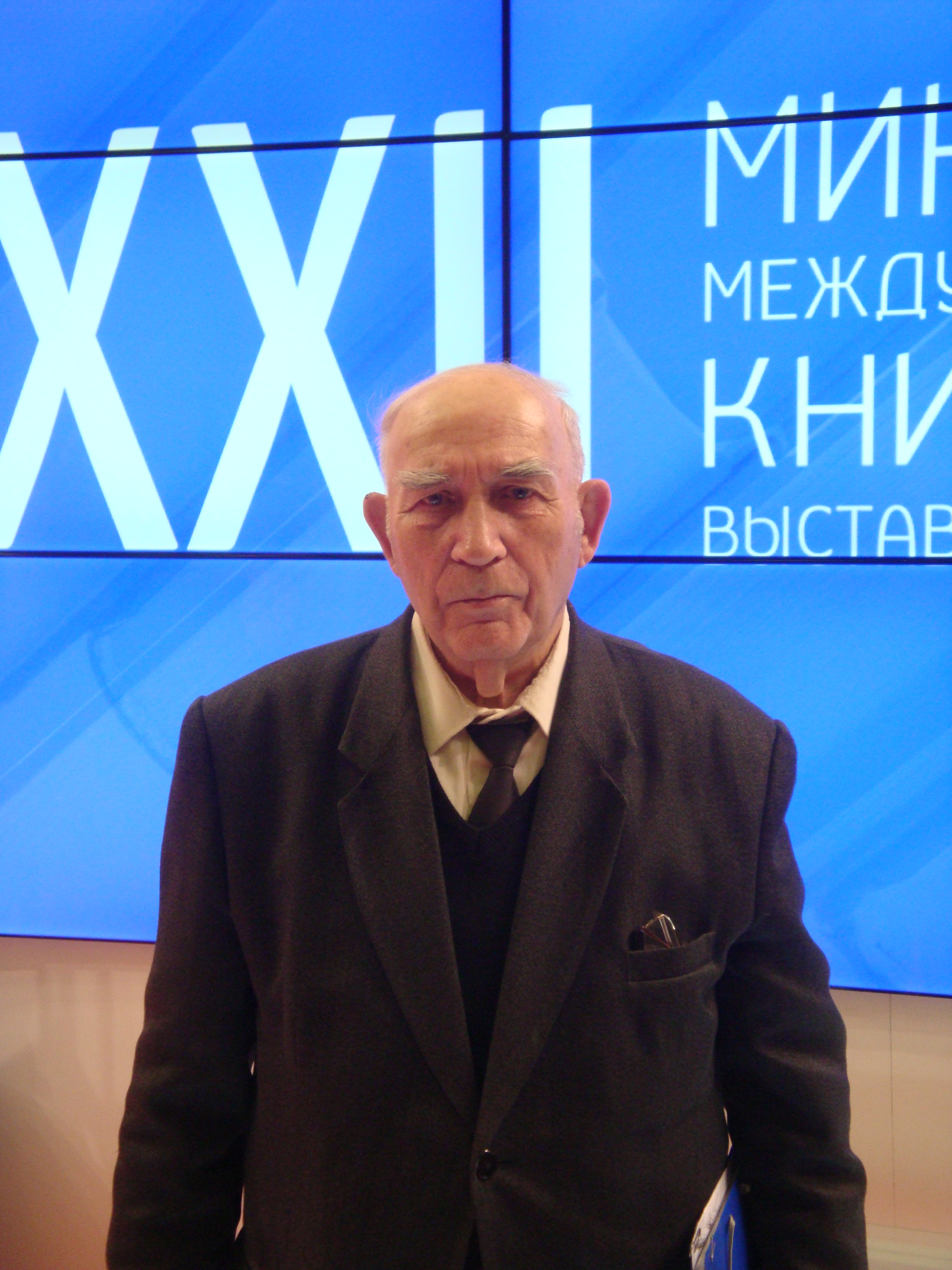
- Born: 16 September 1931; Zarechany, Polotsk district, Belarus
- Died: 23 March 2020 (aged 88); Minsk, Belarus
- Education: Belarusian Pedagogical University
- Scientific career
- Fields: archaeology
- Workplaces: Institute of History of the Belarusian Academy of Sciences

Pyotr Fyodorovich Lysenko (Russian: Пё́тр Фё́дорович Лысе́нко, Belarusian: Пё́тар Фё́даравіч Лысе́нка), (16 September 1931, in Zarechany, Polotsk district, Vitebsk Region, Belarus – 23 March 2020) was a Belarusian archaeologist, Doctor of History (since 1988), professor (since 1993).

He was the author of over 110 scientific works, several monographs. His most famous work is the discovery of the ancient Berestye and establishment of the Berestye Archeological Museum.

Lysenko died on 23 March 2020.

== Writings ==
- “Древнейшие города Белоруссии” (Ancient Towns of Byelorussia). Minsk, 1966. (as a co-author with G.V.Shtykhov) (in Russian)
- “Города Туровской земли” (Towns of Turov Land). Minsk, (1974) (in Russian)
- “Берестье” (Berestye). Minsk, (1985) (in Russian)
- “Отрытие Берестья” (The Discovery of Berestye). Minsk, (1989); (2007) second edition ISBN 978-985-08-0852-3 (in Russian)
- “Дреговичи” (Dregovichy). Minsk, (1991) (in Russian)
- “Древний Пинск IX — XIII вв” (Ancient Pinsk of the 9th–13th centuries). Minsk, (1997); Pinsk, (2007) second edition ISBN 978-985-6515-23-4 (in Russian)
- “Туровская земля IX — XIII вв” (Turov Land of the 9th–13th centuries). Minsk, (1999) 985-08-0096-8; (2001) second edition ISBN 985-08-0454-8 (in Russian)
- “Древний Туров” (Ancient Turov). Minsk, (2004) ISBN 985-08-0615-X (in Russian)
- “Сказание о Турове” (Story about Turov). Minsk, (2006) ISBN 985-08-0762-8; 2007 second edition (in Russian)
