= Sara Szweber =

Russian-born trade unionist and Bundist activist (1875–1966)

Sara Szweber (Polish pronunciation: [ˈsara ˈʂfɛbɛr]; born Pesl Katelianska) (1875 – 1966) was one of the leaders of the Bund and a trade unionist in Russia, Poland, and later in the United States. She was one of the few women that held leadership positions in the Jewish socialist and trade union movements of the late 19th and early 20th century.

Sara came from a family that was initially prosperous but became impoverished while she was young. Her parents died during her childhood and she was raised by her aunt. She worked as a dressmaker in a tailor shop which she helped to organize into a union shop. The workshop she organized, where all workers were paid the same wage and worked the same hours, was used as an example of a democratic workplace by the Russian writer Nikolay Chernyshevsky in his novel What Is to Be Done?.

In 1900, Szweber joined the Jewish Labour Bund (The Bund) and became active in its educational activities and meetings. As a result, she was arrested by the Tsarist authorities in 1903. After her release, during the Revolution of 1905 she headed a joint Polish and Jewish workers' demonstration in Kalisz and for the first time spoke before a large crowd. Afterward she moved to Lublin and then Łódź. She was arrested by the Russians again, imprisoned in Lublin castle, and went on a hunger strike. Possibly because of the hunger strike, she contracted tuberculosis and was therefore released on bail. She took that opportunity to escape to Galicia where she later met her future husband, Elijahu Szweber, an activist who promoted the use of Yiddish. They lived there until the break out of World War I.

In 1918, Sara moved to Warsaw where she worked as a trade union official in the local garment worker's union. Later, together with the Bundist Victor Alter she headed a one hundred thousand strong labor union which joined Polish and Jewish workers, the Landrat. According to Szweber, the activities of the Landrat were hampered by splits within the party which were being organized by Communist party members in the 1920s and '30s. While in Warsaw Szweber became one of the members of Bund's Central Committee. In 1938 she was elected to the Warsaw City Council, together with sixteen other Bund members.

After the Nazi invasion of Poland, Szweber initially escaped to the east, making her way back to her home town of Brest (which had been occupied by the Soviet Union). However, because she was a notable member of the Bund she was in danger of arrest by the NKVD. She managed to escape the Soviets via Vilna, eventually making her way to the United States.

In New York she once again worked as a dressmaker and remained active in the Bund émigré community. At the age of 90, she took part in Bund's fourth World Congress.
