= Brest City Park =

Park in Brest, Belarus

Coordinates: 52°05′40″N 23°40′36″E

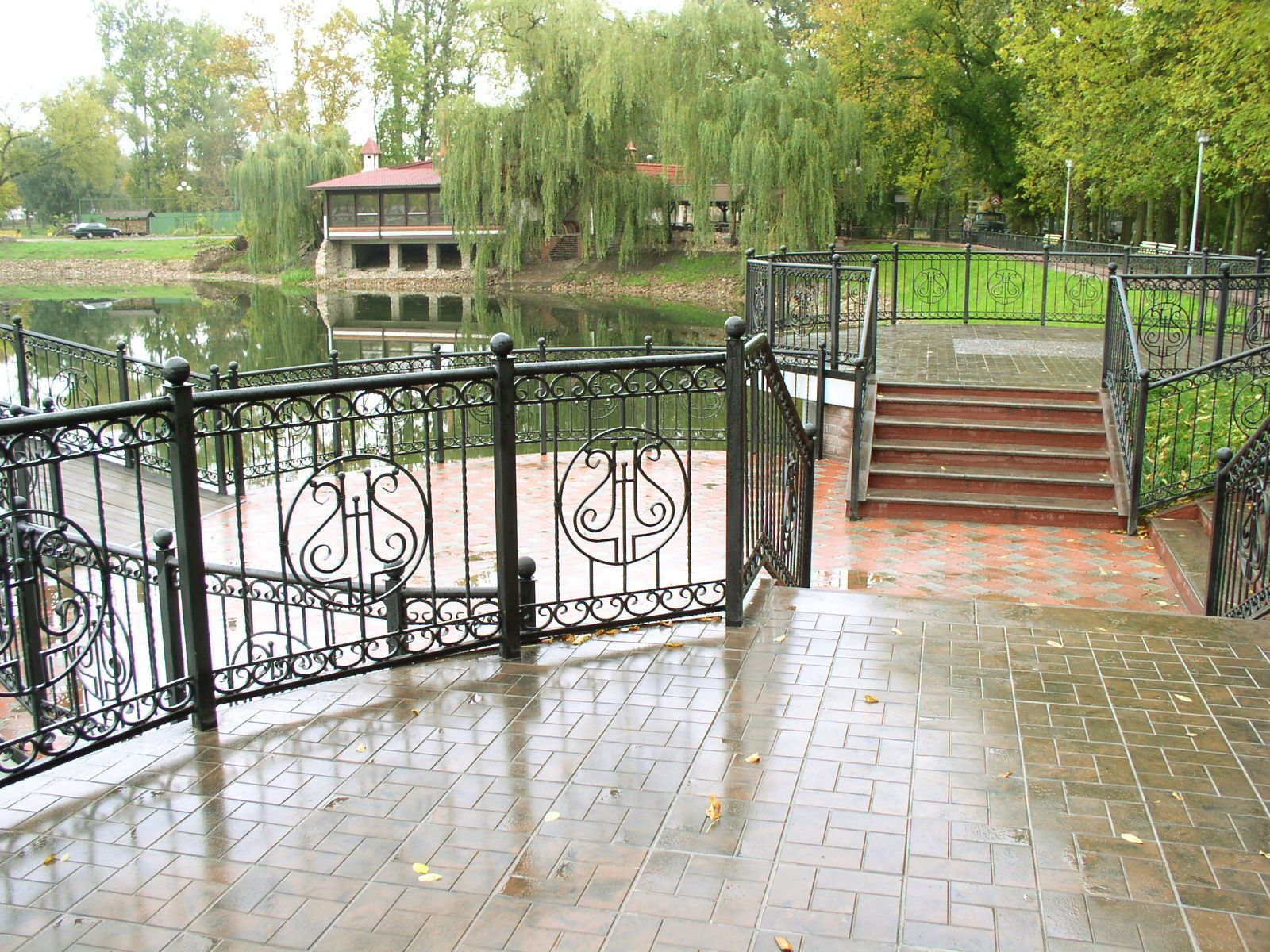
Upper Lake, Brest City Park

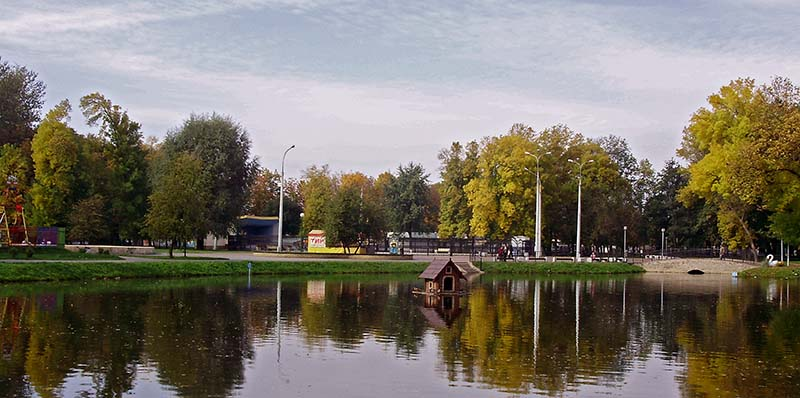
Lower Lake, Brest City Park

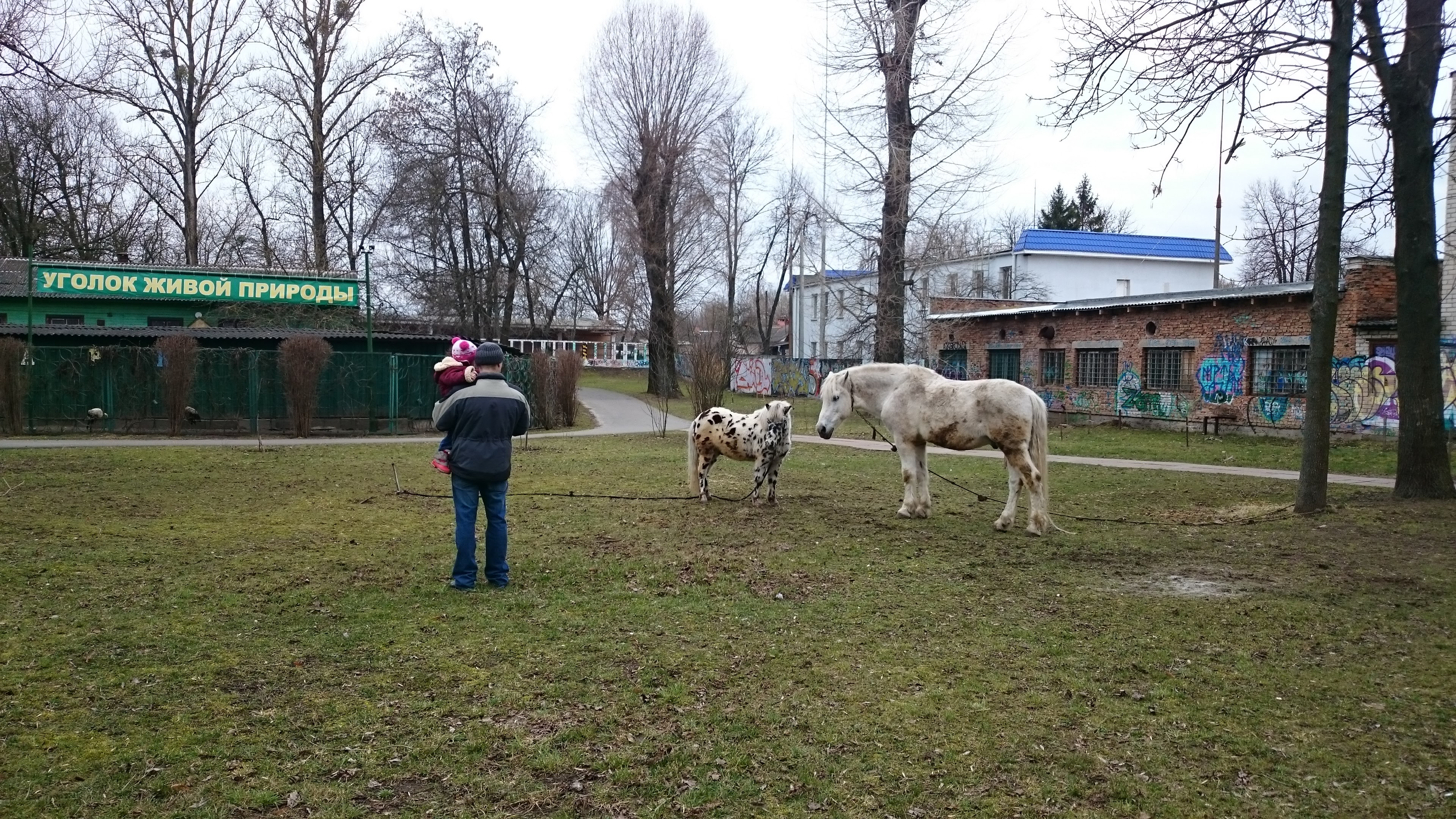
Mini-zoo, Brest City Park

Brest City Park is an urban public park in Brest, Belarus. The Russian soldiers of Libava Regiment, who were stationed in this part of Brest-Litovsk, laid out the park in 1906.

== Overview ==
Initially it covered 4 ha. Today, at over 20 ha, it is the largest public park in the city. The park features dozens of tree species rare in this part of Europe, such as platanus, tamarisk, elm, and serpentine spruce (Picea Abies "Virgata").

2006 marked the park's centenary. The park underwent an all-out reconstruction that lasted two years till 2006. On October 16, 2004, the park was reopened on completion of the first stage of reconstruction. In 2006, the entire reconstruction was completed and the park hosts visitors again. As its official name is First of May Park, it was reopened on May 1.

In the park, visitors can find a large disco club, an open-air concert stage, an amusement park and two lovely ponds called Upper Lake and Lower Lake. These ponds are connected by a canal, with water slowly flowing from Upper Lake to Lower Lake. There are two fountains in Upper Lake, and new bridges span the canal's banks. Another bridge links the island in the centre of Upper Lake with the shore. New iron fences and railings give a fresh look to the sites around the ponds.
