= Arab nationalism =

Political ideology

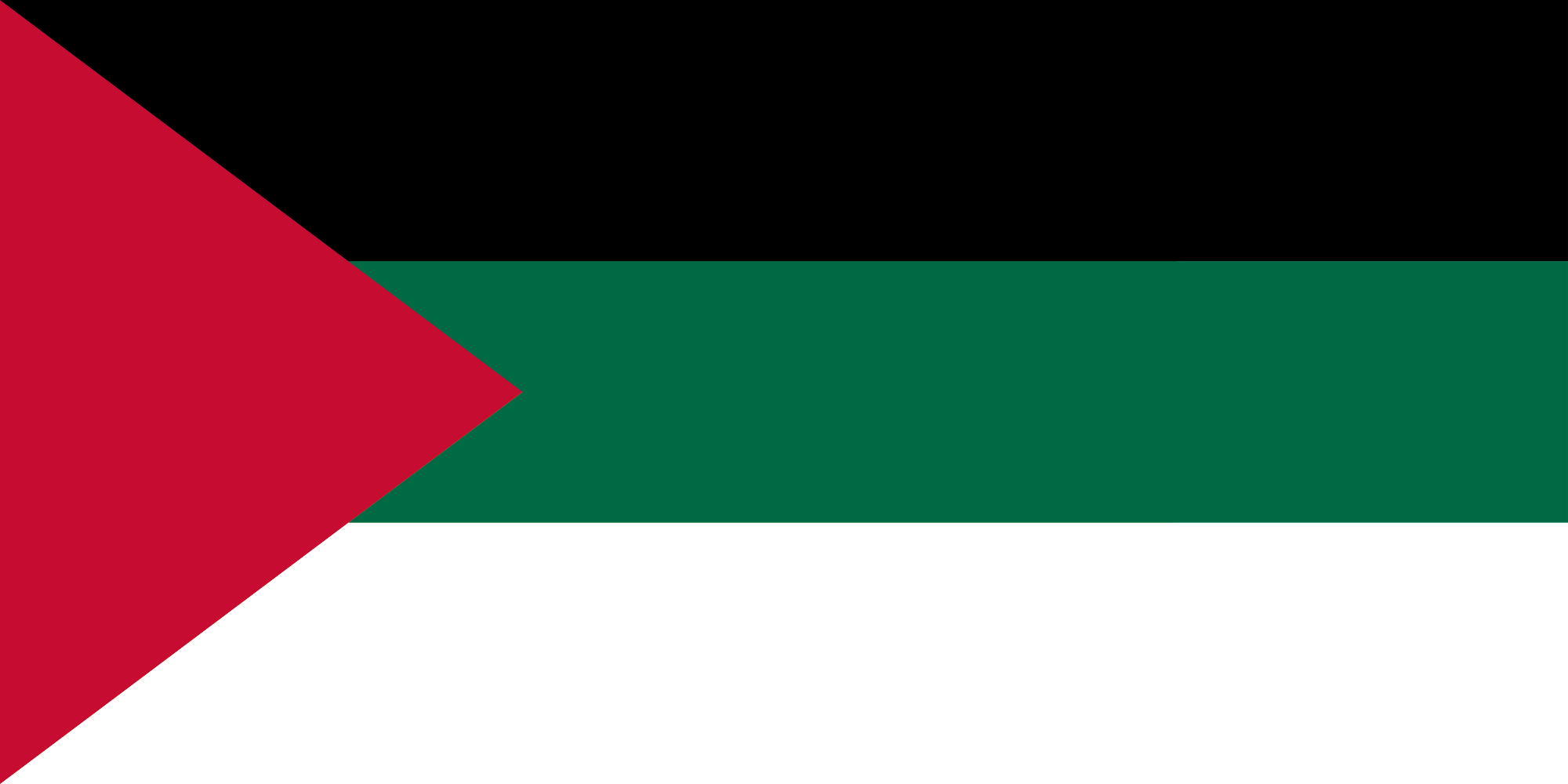
The flag of the Arab Revolt was originally used against the Ottoman Turks, and remains a prominent symbol of Arab nationalism. The design and pan-Arab colours are the basis of many modern Arab states' flags.

The Arab Liberation Flag serves as the basis of the red-white-black tricolor flags used by several Arab states since the 1952 Egyptian revolution

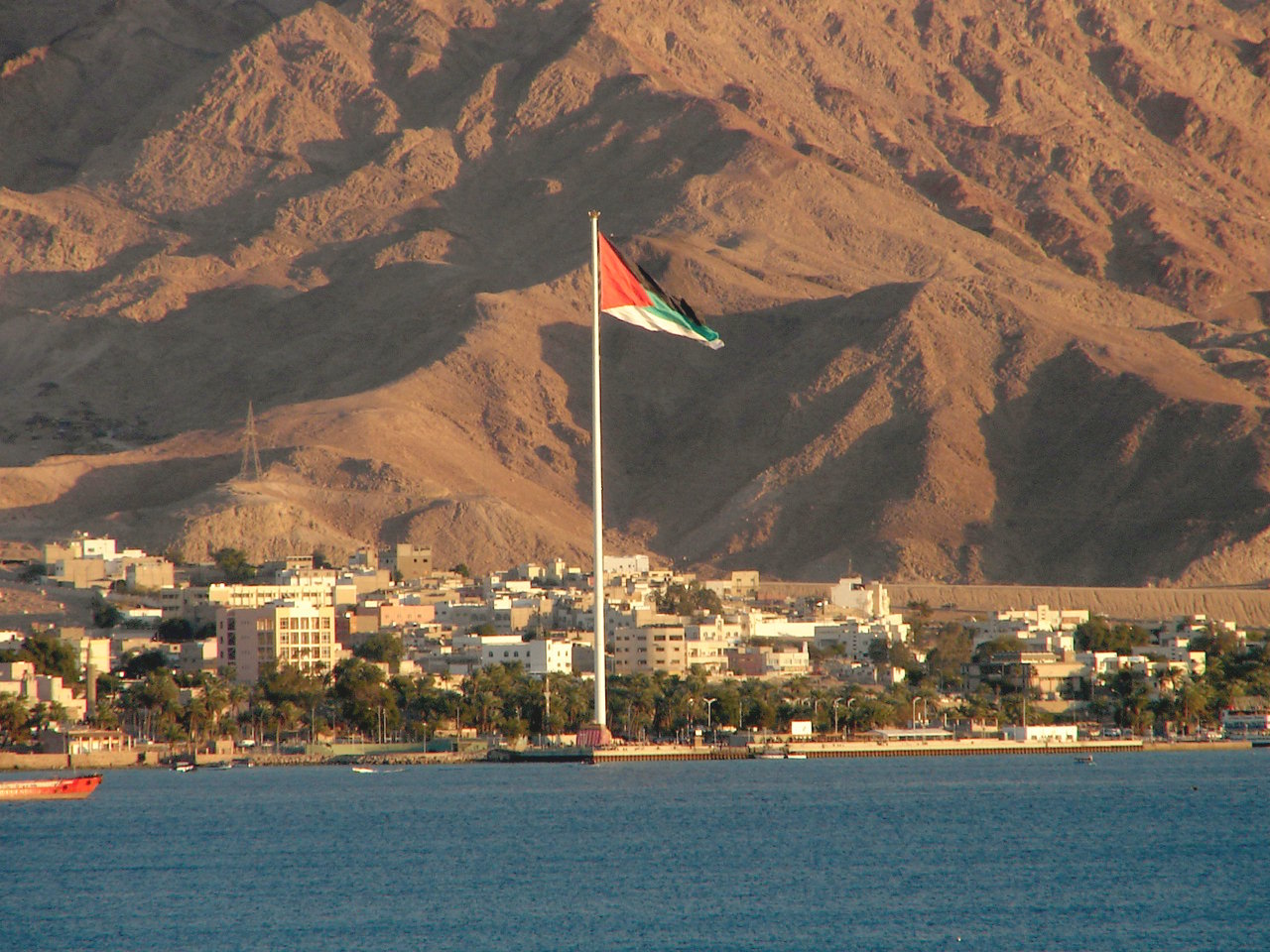
The Aqaba Flagpole in Aqaba, Jordan bearing the flag of the Arab Revolt. The Aqaba Flagpole is the sixth tallest free standing flagpole in the world.

Map of the Arab world

Arab nationalism (Arabic: القومية العربية, romanized: al-qawmīya al-ʿarabīya) is a political ideology asserting that Arabs constitute a single nation. As a traditional nationalist ideology, it promotes Arab culture and civilization, celebrates Arab history, the Arabic language and Arabic literature. It often also calls for unification of Arab society. It bases itself on the premise that the people of the Arab world—from the Atlantic Ocean to the Arabian Sea—constitute one nation bound together by a common identity — ethnicity, language, culture, history, geography, and politics.

Rooted in the 19th-century Nahda, or "Arab Awakening" movement during Ottoman rule, Arab nationalism emerged in the early 20th century as an opposition movement in the Arab provinces of the Ottoman Empire, later evolving into the overwhelmingly dominant ideological force in the Arab world. Initially focused on resisting Ottoman control, it later opposed Western imperialism after World War I due to the undesirable outcome of the Arab Revolt — in successfully achieving their primary goal of dissolving the Ottoman Empire, the Arab rebels simultaneously enabled the partitioning of their would-be unified Arab state by Britain and France. Anti-Western sentiment grew as Arab nationalists rallied around the Palestinian cause, viewing Zionism as a threat to the region's integrity and linking the Arab–Israeli conflict to Western imperialism due to the Balfour Declaration. Arab unity was considered a necessary instrument to "restoring this lost part" of the nation, which in turn meant eliminating the "relics" of foreign colonialism. Its influence steadily expanded over subsequent years. By the 1950s and 1960s, the charismatic Egyptian leader Gamal Abdel Nasser championed Arab nationalism following his seizure and nationalization of the Suez Canal and his "victory" over British–French–Israeli forces in the 1956 Suez Crisis, and political parties like the Ba'ath Party and the Arab Nationalist Movement demonstrated remarkable capabilities for mobilization, organization, and clandestine activities. This ideology seemed to be on the rise across the Arab states, with independent Arab governments such as Syria, Iraq, Algeria, and Egypt adopting Arab nationalism as official state policy.

Its influence began to wane in the following decades, with the rise of nation-state nationalism mostly promoted by each Arab state and the emergence of Islamic radicalism filling the perceived void. However, the ideology as a whole began to decline across the Arab world following the decisive Israeli victory in the Six-Day War. Although pan-Arab nationalism lost appeal by the 1990s, it continued to exercise an intellectual hegemony throughout the Arab world.

Notable personalities that are associated with Arab nationalism include Hussein bin Ali, Faisal I of Iraq, Gamal Abdel Nasser, Yasser Arafat, George Habash, Michel Aflaq, Ahmed Ben Bella, Muammar Gaddafi, and Saddam Hussein.

== Ideology ==
Arab nationalists believe that the Arab nation existed as a historical entity prior to the rise of nationalism in the 19th–20th century. The Arab nation was formed through the gradual establishment of Arabic as the language of communication and with the advent of Islam as a religion and culture in the region. Both Arabic and Islam served as the pillars of the nation. According to writer Youssef M. Choueiri, Arab nationalism represents the "Arabs' consciousness of their specific characteristics as well as their endeavor to build a modern state capable of representing the common will of the nation and all its constituent parts."

Within the Arab nationalist movement are three main ideas: that of the Arab nation; Arab nationalism; and pan-Arab unity. The 1936–1939 Arab revolt in Palestine led to the foundation of the Arab nationalist Ba'ath Party, which asserts that the Arab nation is the group of people who speak Arabic, inhabit the Arab world, and who feel they belong to the same nation, ideologies which originated from Sati' al-Husri's works. Arab nationalism is the "sum total" of the characteristics and qualities exclusive to the Arab nation, whereas pan-Arab unity is the modern idea that stipulates that the separate Arab countries must unify to form a single state under one political system.

Local patriotism centered on individual Arab countries was incorporated into the framework of Arab nationalism starting in the 1920s. This was done by positioning the Arabian Peninsula as the homeland of the Semitic peoples (the Canaanites and Arameans of the Levant and the Assyrians and Babylonians of Mesopotamia) who migrated throughout the Near East in ancient times or by associating the other pre-Islamic cultures, such as those of Egypt and North Africa and Horn of Africa, into an evolving Arab identity.

The modern Arabic language actually has two distinct words which can be translated into English as "nationalism": qawmiyya قومية, derived from the word qawm (meaning "tribe, ethnic nationality"), and wataniyya وطنية, derived from the word watan (meaning "homeland, native country"). The term qawmiyya means attachment to the Arab nation, while wataniyya means loyalty to a single Arab state. Wataniyya is sometimes disparaged as "regionalism" by those who consider pan-Arabism the only legitimate variant of Arab nationalism.

In the post-World War years, the concept of qawmiyya "gradually assumed a leftist connotation, calling for ... the creation of revolutionary Arab unity." Groups who subscribed to this point of view advocated opposition, violent and non-violent, against Israel and against Arabs who did not subscribe to this point of view. The person most identified with qawmiyya was Gamal Abdel Nasser of Egypt, who used both military and political power to spread his version of pan-Arab ideology throughout the Arab world. While qawmiyya still remains a potent political force today, the death of Nasser and the Arab defeat in the Six-Day War has weakened faith in this ideal. The current dominant ideology among Arab policy makers has shifted to wataniyya.

== History ==
=== Origins ===
Throughout the late 19th century, beginning in the 1860s, a sense of loyalty to the "Fatherland" developed in intellectual circles based in the Levant and Egypt, but not necessarily an "Arab Fatherland". It developed from observance of the technological successes of Western Europe which they attributed to the prevailing of patriotism in those countries. During this period, a heavy influx of Christian missionaries and educators from Western countries provided what was termed the "Arab political revival", resulting in the establishment of secret societies within the empire.

The former was also possible with the influence of the intellectual movement produced by the expansion of journalism using a unifying language, with the creation of newspapers in Arabic, as well as the publication of an Arabic dictionary and an encyclopedia during the late 1860s and the early 1870s. This allowed the questioning (albeit limited), of Ottoman power. Accordingly, in the 1860s, literature produced in the Mashriq (the Levant and Mesopotamia) which was under Ottoman control at the time, contained emotional intensity and strongly condemned the Ottoman Turks for "betraying Islam" and the Fatherland to the Christian West. In the view of Arab patriots, Islam had not always been in a "sorry state" and attributed the military triumphs and cultural glories of the Arabs to the advent of the religion, insisting that European modernism itself was of Islamic origin. The Ottomans, on the other hand, had deviated from true Islam and thus suffered decline. The reforming Ottoman and Egyptian governments were blamed for the situation because they attempted to borrow Western practices from the Europeans that were seen as unnatural and corrupt. The Arab patriots' view was that the Islamic governments should revive true Islam that would in turn, pave way for the establishment of constitutional representative government and freedom which, though Islamic in origin, was manifested in the West at the time.

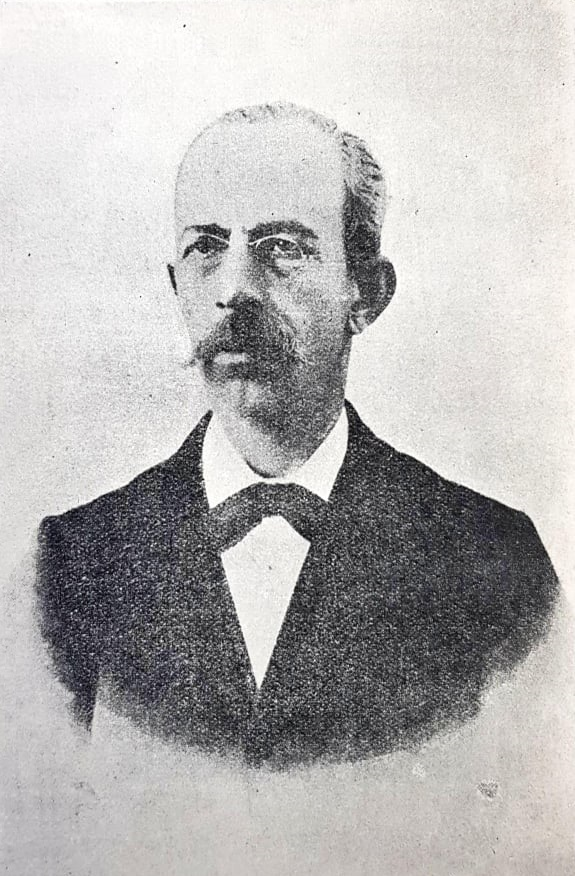
Ibrahim al-Yaziji (1847–1906)

Arabism and regional patriotism (such as in Egypt or in the Levant) mixed and gained predominance over Ottomanism among some Arabs in Syria and Lebanon. Ibrahim al-Yaziji, a Lebanese Christian philosopher, called for the Arabs to "recover their lost ancient vitality and throw off the yoke of the Turks" in 1868. A secret society promoting this goal was formed in the late 1870s, with al-Yazigi as a member. The group placed placards in Beirut calling for a rebellion against the Ottomans. Meanwhile, other Lebanese and Damascus-based notables, mostly Muslims, formed similar secret movements, although they differed as Christian groups who disfavoured Arabism called for a completely independent Lebanon while the Muslim Arab societies generally promoted an autonomous Greater Syria still under Ottoman rule.

As early as 1870, Syrian Christian writer Francis Marrash distinguished the notion of fatherland from that of nation; when applying the latter to Greater Syria, he pointed to the role played by language, besides customs and belief in common interests, in defining national identity. This distinction between fatherland and nation was also made by Hasan al-Marsafi in 1881. By the beginning of the 20th century, groups of Muslim Arabs embraced an Arab nationalist "self-view" that would provide the basis of the Arab nationalist ideology of the 20th century.

This new version of Arab patriotism was directly influenced by the Islamic modernism and revivalism of Muhammad Abduh, the Egyptian Muslim scholar, and Jamal al-Din al-Afghani, Iranian political activist. They both shared their thoughts on reform for Islamic societies by publishing in the journal al-Urwah al-Wuthqa. Abduh believed the Arabs' Muslim ancestors bestowed "rationality on mankind and created the essentials of modernity," borrowed by the West. Thus, while Europe advanced from adopting the modernist ideals of true Islam, the Muslims failed, corrupting and abandoning true Islam. Al-Afghani blamed a division between Muslims on European influence. He thus advocated for pan-Muslim unity as a project to revitalize Islam as a cohesive force against the Western Colonialism, and argued that new interpretations of Islam were needed to confront questions posed by modernity. Their followers would create their own magazines and political parties to develop these ideas. Abduh influenced modern Arab nationalism in particular, because the revival of true Islam's ancestors (who were Arabs) would also become the revival of Arab culture and the restoration of the Arab position as the leaders of the Islamic world. One of Abduh's followers, Abd al-Rahman al-Kawakibi, openly declared that the Ottoman Empire should be both Turkish and Arab, with the latter exercising religious and cultural leadership. due to their historical role in the early Muslim community.

=== Rise of modern Arab nationalism ===
In 1911, Arab intellectuals and politicians from throughout the Levant formed al-Fatat ("the Young Arab Society"), an Arab nationalist secret society and club, in Paris. Its stated aim was "raising the level of the Arab nation to the level of modern nations." In the first few years of its existence, al-Fatat called for greater autonomy within a unified Ottoman state rather than Arab independence from the empire. Al-Fatat hosted the Arab Congress of 1913 in Paris, the purpose of which was to discuss desired reforms with other dissenting individuals from the Arab world. They also requested that Arab conscripts to the Ottoman army not be required to serve in non-Arab regions except in time of war. However, as the Ottoman authorities cracked down on the organization's activities and members, al-Fatat went underground and demanded the complete independence and unity of the Arab provinces.

Nationalist individuals became more prominent during the waning years of Ottoman authority, but the idea of Arab nationalism had virtually no impact on the majority of Arabs as they considered themselves loyal subjects of the Ottoman Empire. The British, for their part, incited the Sharif of Mecca to launch the Arab Revolt during the First World War. The Ottomans were defeated and the rebel forces, loyal to the Sharif's son Faysal ibn al-Husayn entered Damascus in 1918. By now, Faysal along with many Iraqi intellectuals and military officers had joined al-Fatat which would form the backbone of the newly created Arab state that consisted of much of the Levant and the Hejaz.

Damascus became the coordinating center of the Arab nationalist movement as it was seen as the birthplace of the ideology, the seat of Faysal—the first Arab "sovereign" after nearly 400 years of Turkish suzerainty—and because the nationalists of the entire Mashreq region were familiar with it. Nonetheless, Jerusalem, Beirut, and Baghdad remained significant bases of support. Following the creation of the Arab Kingdom of Syria, a serious tension within the nationalist movement became visible; the conflict between the ideology's highest ideal of forming a single independent unit comprising all countries sharing the Arabic language and heritage, and the tendency to give precedence to local ambitions.

To further tensions, a rift formed between the older nationalist members of various Syrian urban-class families and the generally younger nationalists who became close to Faysal, namely, his Hejazi troops, Iraqi and Syrian military officers, and Palestinian and Syrian intellectuals. The older guard was mainly represented by Rida Pasha al-Rikabi, who served as Faysal's prime minister, while the younger guard did not have one particular leader. However, the youth within al-Fatat founded the Arab Independence Party ("al-Istiqlal") in February 1919. Its goal was to achieve unity and complete Arab independence. Prominent members included Izzat Darwaza and Shukri al-Quwatli. Centered in Damascus with branches in various cities throughout the Levant, al-Istiqlal received political and financial support from Faysal, but relied on the inner circle of al-Fatat to survive.

During the war, Britain had been a major sponsor of Arab nationalist thought and ideology, primarily as a weapon to use against the power of the Ottoman Empire. Although the Arab forces were promised a state that included much of the Arabian Peninsula and the Fertile Crescent, the secret Sykes–Picot Agreement between Britain and France provided for the territorial division of much of that region between the two imperial powers. During the interwar years and the British Mandate period, when Arab lands were under French and British control, Arab nationalism became an important anti-imperial opposition movement against European rule. While Iran and Turkey had strong central states, the Arab nationalist movement lacked a country committed to a unified pan-Arab entity.

=== Growth of the movement ===
In the short-lived kingdom, Faysal's government used the press to promote the new nationalist vocabulary and a specifically nationalist history of the wartime revolt. The Halab newspaper, out of Aleppo, published a proclamation requiring "Turks" to register with authorities, which historian Keith Watenpaugh sees as "part of a drive to cleanse the city of now "unnatural" elements". Watenpaugh also describes how Halab equated "Arab" with "Arabic speaking" despite the prevalance of bi- and trilingualism in Aleppo at the time.

A number of Arab revolts against the European powers took place following the establishment of the British and French mandates. With the fall of the Ottoman Empire, a new form of colonial control arose. As the mandate system allowed for Britain and France to continue their presence in the region. Resentment of British rule culminated in the Iraqi Revolt of 1920. The uprising which was carried out by the urban population as well as the rural tribes of Iraq ended in 1921, after which the British role was virtually reduced to an advisory one. In 1925, the Druze of southern Syria under the leadership of Sultan al-Atrash revolted against French rule. The revolt subsequently spread throughout Syria, particularly in Damascus. The French responded by systematically bombarding the city, resulting in thousands of deaths. The revolt was put down by the end of the year, but it is credited with forcing the French to take more steps towards Syrian independence. In Egypt, resentment of British hegemony led to wide-scale revolts across the country in 1919. As a result of three-year negotiations following the uprising, the British agreed to allow Egypt's official independence in 1922, but their military still held great influence in the country. The political leaders of the Egyptian revolution espoused Egyptian nationalism, rather than an Arab nationalist alternative.

The relative independence of Egypt, Iraq, Saudi Arabia and North Yemen encouraged Arab nationalists to put forward programs of action against colonial powers in the region. Notably, Orit Bashkin observes how Jewish communities in the newly established Arab states embraced these emerging anti-colonial narratives, and in the interwar period many Jewish intellectuals played a role in the formation of the new national language. In these early years, Jews formed an integral part of political institutions in various Arab states.

According to historian Youssef Choueiri, the "first public glimmerings" of a pan-Arab approach occurred in 1931, during the convention of World Islamic Congress in Jerusalem which highlighted Muslim fears of the increasing growth of Zionism in Palestine. Arab delegates held a separate conference and for the first time delegates from North Africa, Egypt, the Arabian Peninsula and the Fertile Crescent convened together to discuss Arab matters. A pan-Arabist covenant was proclaiming the Arab countries form an indivisible whole, denouncing and resisting colonialism as incompatible with the dignity and paramount aims of the Arab nation. The Association of Algerian Muslim Ulama founded in 1931 was a major Islamist and Arab nationalist movement in French Algeria. Its motto was "Islam is our religion, Algeria is our homeland, Arabic is our language", and emphasized an Arab-Islamic national identity in Algeria. Its founder Abdelhamid ibn Badis identified Islam, Arabism, and nationalism as the three main components of the Algerian national character distinct from France, while his fellow 'alim Ahmad Tawfiq al-Madani (1889–1983) later wrote extensive historical writings celebrating the Muslim and Arab ancestors of Algeria. This also drew Algerian public attention to what was happening in Mandatory Palestine, describing the events in 1936 as an "insult to all Muslim countries and a degradation of Arabism" and events in 1947 as "test set up by God in order to examine the Muslims and the Arabs' faith". It also stressed the view that Palestine belongs to all Arabs and not only to Palestinians. In 1955, it joined the Arab nationalist National Liberation Front's insurgency against France in the Algerian War.

Plans for a near-future conference were made, but never came into play due to Faysal's death in 1933 and fierce British opposition. However, the Arab Independence Party was formed by Palestinian and Iraqi activists from al-Fatat as a direct result of the Jerusalem conference on 13 August 1932. Most of the AIP's activities were centered in the Palestinian political field, but the party also worked towards achieving Arab unity and solidarity as a means to strengthen Arab resistance against the British Mandate in Palestine and increased Jewish settlement occurring there. In August 1933, the League of Nationalist Action (LNA) was founded in Lebanon by Western-educated professional civil service groups with the aims of creating a common Arab market and industrial base as well as the abolishment of customs barriers between the Arab countries. By proposing agrarian reforms to limit the power of landowners, abolishing what they considered "feudalism" and promoting the growth of an industry, the LNA sought to undermine the absentee landlords in the Levant who tended to encourage local nationalism and were open to working with European authorities or Jewish land purchasers. The LNA enjoyed a level of popularity throughout the 1930s, but did not survive into the 1940s.

According to Ella Shohat, the idea of Arabness and Jewishness as mutually exclusive gradually came to be shared by both Zionist and Arab nationalist discourse. Following the killing of the Syrian Arab guerrilla leader Izz ad-Din al-Qassam by British forces in Ya'bad, Arab-Jewish tensions in Palestine reached a climax. Anti-Zionist sentiments reached a boiling point on 15 April 1936, when an armed group of Arabs killed a Jewish civilian after intercepting his car near the village of Bal'a. After Jews retaliated by killing two Arab farmers near Jaffa, this sparked an Arab revolt in Palestine. The AIP along with Palestinian notables selected popular leader and Grand Mufti of Jerusalem, Amin al-Husseini to lead the uprising. The Arab Higher Committee (AHC), a national committee bringing together Arab factions in Palestine, was established to coordinate the uprising. To protest increased Jewish immigration, a general strike was declared and a political, economic, and social boycott of Jews soon ensued.

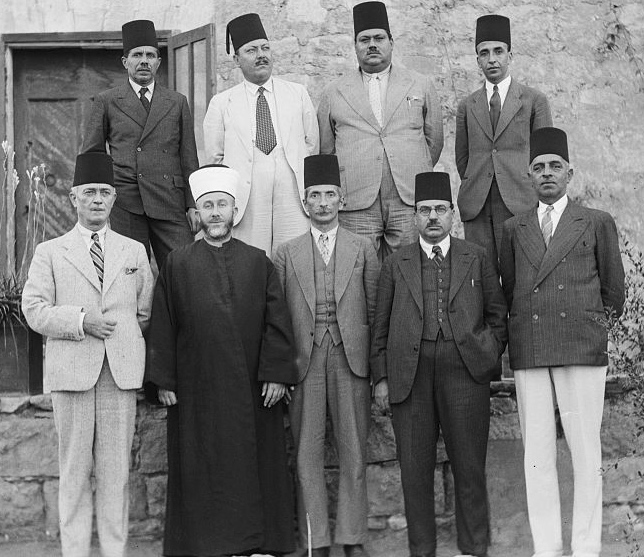
Members of the Arab Higher Committee, 1936; clockwise, Jamal al-Husayni, Hussein Khalidi, Yaqub al-Ghusayn, Fuad Saba, Alfred Roke, Abdul Latif Es-Salah, Ahmed Hilmi, Amin al-Husseini, and Raghib al-Nashashibi.

The events in Palestine followed similar anti-colonial activities in Egypt, Syria and Algeria which helped inspire the uprising. In Egypt, week-long anti-British demonstrations had eventually resulted in the restoration of the Egyptian constitution while in Syria, a general strike held in January–February 1936 led to major negotiations for an independence deal with the French government. The British took a firm stance against the nationalist revolt in Palestine, dissolving the AHC forcing al-Husayni into exile in Lebanon in 1937. In Algeria, hostility towards the Jewish community saw an attack in Constantine in the summer of 1934 in which a number of Jews were killed, in response to the events in Palestine. Al-Husayni, who leaned more towards Palestinian nationalism, was instrumental in organizing the pan-Arab Bloudan Conference on 9 September 1937 in Syria which gathered 524 delegates from across the Arab world, although al-Husayni himself was not in attendance. According to author Adeeb Dawisha, although the uprising had been quelled by 1939, it greatly "contributed to the growth of Arab nationalist sentiment" and began the development of "solidarity" between Arab governments.

Meanwhile, a clandestine Arab nationalist society was formed in Iraq in 1938 which came to be known as Arab Nationalist Party (ANP). The ANP typically confined itself to influencing events and leaders in Iraq rather than taking the lead of a mass nationalist movement. King Ghazi of Iraq was one such leader. Ghazi intended to build a strong Iraqi army and actively sought to annex Kuwait. Many Arab nationalist politicians from Kuwait, who favored independence particularly after the discovery of oil there in 1938, were provided safe haven in Iraq after being repressed by the quasi-rulers of the sheikhdom, the Al Sabah family (Kuwait was still a British territory at the time). Ghazi died in a car accident in 1939, prompting a number of his army officers to allege the king was assassinated by British forces. That same year, al-Husayni arrived in Baghdad after escaping from Lebanon, giving a morale boost to the pan-Arab dimension in Iraqi politics. The prime minister at the time, Nuri al-Said and the regent king Abd al-Ilah, did not harbor the pan-Arabist sympathies Ghazi espoused.

Rashid Ali al-Gaylani succeeded al-Said as Prime Minister in March 1940 and took a neutral position regarding World War II, opening dialogue with the German government which was at war with Britain. Under great pressure from the latter, al-Gaylani resigned on 31 January 1941 and al-Said took his place. The perceived British interjection in Iraq's internal affairs angered Arab nationalist officers in the army, leading a group of them to overthrow the government in April and install al-Gaylani as Prime Minister. To counter a British military response to the coup, al-Gaylani enlisted the support of Germany, but the German military did not arrive to aid the Arab nationalist government. With pro-German Vichy France having taken control of neighboring Syria, Britain reoccupied Iraq in May to prevent it from joining the Axis powers. By 1 June, al-Gaylani and al-Husayni fled to the country for Germany, while the army officers who carried out the coup were captured and executed.

Al-Husayni became increasingly acquainted with Adolf Hitler, the Nazi leader of Germany, and other Nazi officials and attempted to coordinate Nazi and Arab policies to solve what he believed was the "Jewish problem" in Palestine. In one of the mufti's speeches he asked Arabs to unite and "kill the Jews wherever you find them." Throughout World War II, the Nazi government, seeking to take advantage of widespread anti-imperialist feelings in the Middle East, had broadcast antisemitic messages tailored to Arabic-speaking Muslims in the Middle East via radio.

The conflict in Iraq provoked anger and frustration throughout the Arab world and the British acknowledged the rapid growth of Arab nationalist feeling among the Arab population, large segments of which saw the events in Iraq as a valiant struggle against imperialism. British Foreign Secretary, Anthony Eden, officially stated Britain's support of strong pan-Arab ties in a bid to ease anti-British sentiments in the region. The events of the region influenced the creation of the Arab Union Club in Egypt in 1942 which called for developing stronger ties between Egypt and the Arab world. Branches were subsequently opened in Baghdad, Beirut, Jaffa and Damascus, and Egyptian Prime Minister Mostafa el-Nahas adopted its platform, pledging to help protect "the interests and rights" of the "sister Arab nations" and explore the "question of Arab unity."

=== Establishment of the Arab League ===
Rivalry for the leadership of the Arab world developed mostly between the political establishments of Iraq and Egypt in the period following the failure of Rashid Ali coup. Eden's stated support for increased Arab ties encouraged Nuri al-Said of Iraq to propose his own plan for Arab unity in January 1943, dubbed the "Fertile Crescent Union." The plan recognized the linguistic, cultural and economic ties between the states of the Fertile Crescent region as well as the differences between their inhabitants. It sought to unify those states in a stage-based process whereby the initial stage would see Syria, Transjordan, Palestine and Lebanon unite with limited autonomy given to the Jews in Palestine and special rights for the Christians in Lebanon. Afterward the Levantine state and Iraq would form an "Arab League," to which other Arab states could join, that would oversee matters of defense, foreign policy, customs, currency and the safeguarding of minorities. The proposal reflected a combination of factors, namely the expansionist ambitions of the Hashemites, the attempt by Iraq's political establishment to secure the mantle of Arab leadership in their rivalry with Egypt and a genuine embrace of Arab identity by Iraq's leaders.

The Egyptian government of Nahas Pasha launched a rival initiative for establishing closer inter-Arab relations, and sent delegations to several Arab states. Influential Arab nationalist figures in the country sought to emphasize Egypt's Arab character, the most prominent of them, Abdul Rahman al-Azzam, even writing "Egypt was an Arab country before Christ." The apparent Egyptian embrace of Arabism was met with general Arab excitement at the popular level and Pasha's efforts gained more traction among the various Arab governments than al-Said's Fertile Crescent proposal. Reasons for this ranged from the antipathy of the Saudi royal family and the Damascus political establishment to the leadership ambitions of the rival Hashemite family to the belief by Lebanon's Maronite Christian community that Egypt's plan would not require conceding future independence. Between 25 September-8 October 1944, the leaders of Iraq, Syria, Saudi Arabia, Lebanon, Transjordan, Yemen and the Palestinian Arab community convened in Alexandria, Egypt in a meeting hosted by the Egyptian government which ended with an agreement known as the "Alexandria Protocol."

=== Peak under Egyptian leadership ===
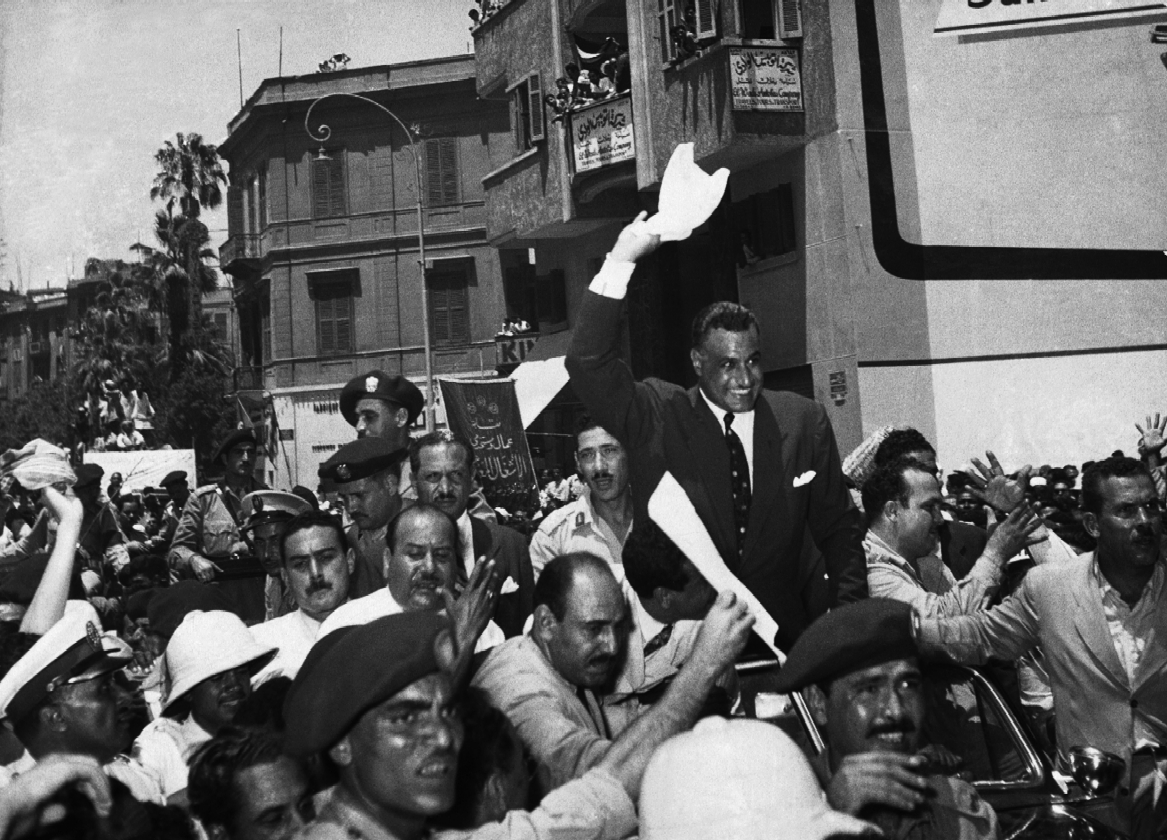
Egyptian president Gamal Abdel Nasser returns to cheering crowds in Cairo after announcing the nationalization of the Suez Canal Company, August 1956.

After the Second World War, Gamal Abdel Nasser, the leader of Egypt, was a significant player in the rise of Arab nationalism. Opposed to the British control of the Suez Canal Zone and concerned about Egypt becoming a Cold War battleground Nasser pushed for a collective Arab security pact within the framework of the Arab League. A key aspect of this was the need for economic aid that was not dependent on peace with Israel and the establishment of U.S. or British military bases within Arab countries. Nasser nationalized the Suez Canal and directly challenged the dominance of the Western powers in the region. At the same time he opened Egypt up as a Cold War zone by receiving aid and arms shipments from the Soviet bloc countries that were not dependent on treaties, bases and peace accords. However, because of the connotations for Cold War dominance of the region, Egypt also received aid from the US, who sought to promote the emerging Arab nationalism as a barrier to communism.

Gamal Abdel Nasser was a major supporter of the Algerian independence movement, whose mixture of Arab nationalism and revolution appealed to the Arabs in North Africa. He provided financial, diplomatic and military support to the National Liberation Front, and based the Algerian provisional government in Cairo. This played a major role in France's decision to wage war against him during the 1956 Suez Crisis. Albert Camus argued that Algerian nationalism was closely tied to Nasserism and Pan-Arabism in an essay titled 'Algeria 1958'. Algerian president Houari Boumédiène, who pursued Arab socialist and Pan-Arabist policies, drafted a new Algerian constitution in 1976 which declared "the unity of the Arab people is written in the community of the destinies of these people. When there will be the conditions for a unity based on the liberation of the popular masses, Algeria will engage itself in the promotion of the formulas of union, integration or fusion that may fully respond to the legitimate and deep aspirations of the Arab people". Like his predecessor Ahmed Ben Bella, he imposed Arab socialism as the state ideology and declared Islam the state religion, however he was more assertive than Ben Bella in carrying out Arabization to reverse French colonization, especially between 1970 and 1977.

The question of Palestine and opposition to Zionism became a rallying point for Arab nationalism from both a religious perspective and a military perspective. The fact that the Zionists were Jewish promoted a religious flavor to the xenophobic rhetoric and strengthened Islam as a defining feature of Arab nationalism. The humiliating defeat in the 1948 Arab–Israeli War strengthened the Arabs' resolve to unite in favor of a pan-Arab nationalist ideal. With the revival of the Palestinian nationalist movement, a debate circled between those who believed that pan-Arab unity would bring about destruction of Israel (the view advocated by the Arab Nationalist Movement) or whether the destruction of Israel would bring about pan-Arab unity (the view advocated by Fatah).

Pan-Arabism was initially a secular movement. Arab nationalists generally rejected religion as a main element in political identity, and promoted the unity of Arabs regardless of sectarian identity. However, the fact that most Arabs were Muslims was used by some as an important building block in creating a new Arab national identity. An example of this was Michel Aflaq, founder along with Salah al-Din al-Bitar and Zaki al-Arsuzi of the Ba'ath Party in Syria in the 1940s. Aflaq, thought himself a Christian, viewed Islam as a testament to the "Arab genius", and once said "Muhammed was the epitome of all the Arabs. So let all the Arabs today be Muhammed." Since the Arabs had reached their greatest glories through the expansion of Islam, Islam was seen as a universal message as well as an expression of secular genius on the part of the Arab peoples. Islam had given the Arabs a "glorious past", which was very different from the "shameful present". In effect, the troubles of the Arab presence were because the Arabs had diverged from their "eternal and perfect symbol", Islam. The Arabs needed to have a "resurrection" (ba'ath in Arabic). After the Ba'athist military coups in Iraq and Syria in the 1960s, the Ba'athists "contributed very little to the development of all-Arab nationalism, which was its original raison d'etre."

Another example of the occasional mingled of Arab nationalism and Islamic revivalist sentiment was from Hassan al-Banna, the founder of the earliest and largest revivalist organization, the Muslim Brotherhood. While in theory Islamic revivalists (for example Sayyid Qutb) were implacably opposed to nationalism as a European pollution intended to weaken Islamic unity, al-Banna "had regarded the transfer of power to non-Arabs after the first four 'Rightfully Guided' caliphs as the true reason for the decline of Islam."

Meanwhile, King Faisal of Saudi Arabia sought to counter the influences of Arab nationalism and communism in the region by promoting pan-Islamism as an alternative. He called for the establishment of the Muslim World League, visiting several Muslim countries to advocate the idea. He also engaged in a propaganda and media war with Nasser.

=== Women and nationalism ===
Women were active participants in the nationalist mobilizations. Arab nationalism became an opportunity for women to appear in public spaces –which were traditionally reserved for men, not only as protesters but also as founders of their own unions and organizations. One example is Hoda Sha'rawi, who marched with other women during the 1919 revolution against the British and would then create the Egyptian Feminist Union. (Male) Islamic modernists Muhammad Abduh and Jamal al-Din al-Afghani, along with Egyptian judge and intellectual Qasim Amine, are considered precursors of women's ideological discussion due to their reflections on the role of women in Islamic reforms. However, women themselves also contributed to the intellectual foundations of the ideology by publishing articles where they made demands, such as the expansion of education, in journals dedicated to Arab history and culture. Hind Nawfal established the first Arab women's magazine, Al-Fatat, in Egypt. This title became the foremother of a subsequent group of publications that came to be known as women's journals.

In this context, it has been argued that women's participation was used as an ideological instrument by Arab nationalism. They were considered "bearers of the nation", because they not only had the biological capability to give birth to future generations, but their own preparation signified a better education for their children. The former was a consequence of the creation of a "maternalist frame" for national and historical symbols, which women themselves adopted to construct their activism. Nermin Allam proposes the term "domestication of female public bravery" to refer to how women's participation has been reduced in the imaginary of the struggle to constrain their questioning of hierarchies.

Women were important to the movement in relation to the family unit. But women's presence in the nationalist pursuit was crucial considering that "building a nation-state required the mobilization of the entire population, both male and female". The former can also be seen in Palestine, where women partaken in a demonstration in opposition to the heavy flow of Zionist immigrants in 1921, or with their gradual participation in Algeria's War of Independence as nurses, cooks, and even carrying bombs. In July 1957, Djamila Bouhired was tried for allegedly bombing a cafe, which killed 11 civilians inside. Moreover, female political involvement has been considered by several authors as a necessary dimension of Arab nationalism, because it is, in essence, a "gendered discourse". The community that was imagined by nationalist groups was largely dependent on the status they assigned to women: modernist nationalists considered their inclusion in the public space as a necessary measure to achieve modernity, while conservative nationalists would vindicate their traditional roles as symbols of Islamic culture.

To modernists between the end of the nineteenth century and the beginning of the twentieth, the status of women in Arab society was seen as a symptom of backwardness. Consequently, the reinterpretation of Islamic texts proposed with the revival of Arab culture also included the question of women. This was possible before nationalism became directly opposed to the European model. In this sense, the connection of the "ideal Arab woman" to the conceptions of modernity made women "markers of cultural borders". Consistent with this logic would be the discussion on the unveiling of women, which came to be used as a symbol of progress in the early twentieth century by Egypt. Additionally, Tunisian women protested its usage for the first time during the 1920s and the 1930s. However, this image "...was not much different from that of a tractor, an industrial complex, or a new railroad in symbolizing the modern, the development, the progress"; its value was not related to any notion of emancipation.

The question of women became more complex to deal with once the requirement of women's political involvement needed to coexist with the continuity of tradition. When Arab nationalism directly challenged Western cultural influence, women's compliance with Arab values was key to distinguish themselves from Europe, or not to become Western-like. The former can be exemplified by how the use of the veil was reintroduced as a nationalist symbol during the Algerian War of Independence, in response to the strong French campaign against its use during the 1930s. Some authors argue there is a link between opposition to Westernization and the strengthening of domestic roles to protect Arab identity. Nadje Al-Ali and Beth Baron call this a process of gendering of nationalism, where the Arab nationalist discourse replicated the most conservative conceptions of womanhood. Following this logic, the laws that regulated the private sphere became stricter, or tightened. Conversely, this assertion has been nuanced by Deniz Kandiyoti, under the argument that the relationship between Islam and women's rights is "politically convergent" and should not be generalized nor simplified without a proper study of each case.

Because of this, the expansion of women's political and economic rights was achieved under nationalist regimes, but it was deficient when it came to questioning their domestic limitations, such as polygamy, divorce, and the minimum age for marriage. In Egypt, the 1956 Constitution granted women the right to vote for the first time in history, as well as their right to education and employment. Nasser also guaranteed economic rights to the working class and the peasantry regardless of gender. The Algerian constitution also acknowledged equal rights to all citizens, but until 1984 no changes were made in personal status codes, and social attitudes toward women receiving education beyond the primary level or going to work were restrictive. Associated is the phenomenon of state-feminism, which refers to the state's co-option of women's agenda to gain political legitimacy and constrict female mobilization. This was a strategy used by Nasser, who banned the creation of autonomous organizations and formulated women's demands as social welfare issues, leading to a recession of Egyptian feminist activism.

=== Decline ===
After the defeat of the Arab coalition by Israel during the 1967 Six-Day War—which the reigning Arab nationalist leader Nasser had dubbed al-Ma‘raka al-Masiriya (the battle of destiny)—the Arab nationalist movement is said to have suffered an "irreversible" slide towards "political marginality".

From the mid-1960s onward, the movement was further weakened by factional splits and ideological infighting. The formerly pro-Nasser Arab Nationalist Movement, publicly abandoned Nasserism in favor of Marxism–Leninism and fell apart soon after. In 1966, the Arab Socialist Ba'ath Party split into rival factions based in Baghdad and Damascus, respectively, though both the Iraqi and Syrian parties engaged in demographic engineering against non-Arab populations. Most notably, the Ba'athist Arabization campaigns in northern Iraq culminated in the Anfal campaign, while the Arab Belt project in Syria involved the expulsion of Kurds from public land used as pasture, and the settlement of Arabs, in their place.

The historian Adeed Dawisha observes the decline in Arab nationalism's popularity was, in part, due to the elimination of many of the political factors that stoked nationalist passion in the Arab world during the 1950s and early 1960s, while Fred Halliday cites the “failure of the secular state, in its economic, social, and state-building roles, as well as in foreign policies, that led to the rejection of nationalism, and associated ideas of socialism and revolution, in much of the Arab world”. In his 1905 book Awakening of the Arab Nation, Naguib Azoury predicted an inevitable clash between Arab nationalism and Zionism that would result in the defeat of one or the other. This prediction proved largely correct in 1967, when the Six-Day War when hopes for a pan-Arab state became fractured and Arab leaders shifted their focus to recovering territories captured by Israel in the war.

Other factors given for the decline include: regional attachments such as Iraqi president Abdul-Karim Qasim's "Iraq first" policy, suspicion of Arab unity by minority groups such as Kurds in Iraq who were non-Arab, or Shia Arabs in Iraq who feared Arab nationalism was actually "a Sunni project" to establish "Sunni hegemony", the Islamic revival, which grew as Arab nationalism declined, and whose Islamist adherents were very hostile towards nationalism in general, believing it had no place in Islam, and lack of interest by the movement in pluralism, separation of powers, freedom of political expression and other democratic concepts which might have "resuscitated" the ideology in its moment of weakness.

However, Halliday notes how many ideas and goals of the emerging Islamist movements resembled, and even derived from, the programmes of the earlier, secular nationalists. He says, “the Islamist movements were beneficiaries and inheritors of the secular nationalist agenda”.

In the 21st century, following the Arab Spring, support for Arab and even most local nationalist movements declined further. Dawisha states the "irrelevance of secular nationalism to the concerns of the twenty-first century paved the way for increasingly violent competition between the state and political Islam for the loyalty, as well as for the hearts and minds of the Arab citizen", observing Arab nationalism has no role in this struggle.

== Attempts at unity ==
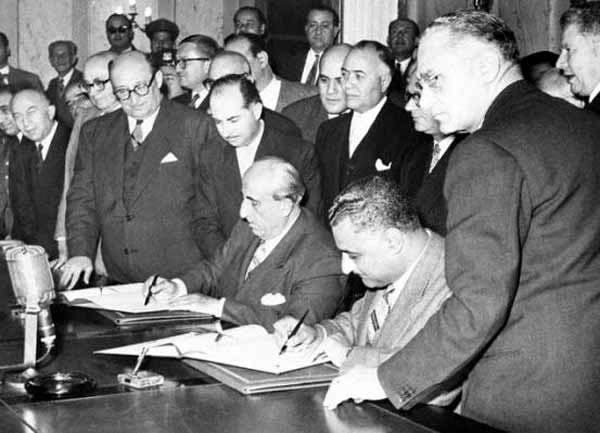
President Gamal Abdel Nasser signing unity pact with President Shukri al-Quwatli, forming the United Arab Republic, February 1958

In the 1940s, rulers such as Abdullah I of Jordan and Nuri al-Said of Iraq sought to create an expanded Arab empire constructed out of the smaller nation-states that had been created in the mandate period. Abdullah's dream was to be king of a Greater Syria while as-Said's dream was for a Fertile Crescent Federation. These aspirations, however, were unpopular and met with suspicion in the countries they sought to conquer. The creation of the Arab League and its insistence on the territorial integrity and respect for sovereignty of each member state, the assassination of Abdullah, and the 14 July Revolution weakened the political feasibility of these ideas.

During much of the 20th century, the rivalry between Syria and Nasser in Egypt for who would lead the union undermined the effort of forming a united Arab state. In 1958, Egypt and Syria temporarily joined to create the United Arab Republic. It was accompanied by attempts to include Iraq and North Yemen in the union. This very exercise, while fostering Egypt's position at the centre of Arab politics, led to the weakening of Syria.

With the 14 July Revolution taking place in Iraq the same year, Western powers feared the fallouts of a powerful Arab nationalism in the region. Foreign powers were not only concerned about the possible spread of such revolutionary movements in other Arab states, but also worried about losing the control and monopoly over the region's natural oil resources. However, due to discontent over the hegemony of Egypt and after a coup in Syria that introduced a more radical government to power, the United Arab Republic collapsed in 1961. The term United Arab Republic continued to be used in Egypt until 1971, after the death of Nasser.

Another unsuccessful attempt at union occurred in 1963. That year the Arab nationalist Ba'ath Party came to power in Syria and Iraq and talks were held on uniting the two countries with Egypt. On 17 April an agreement to unite the countries was signed, but Ba'ath leaders complained of what they considered Egyptian president Nasser's "patronizing, bullying tone" and his insistence on a single centralized party structure under his leadership. In Syria, pro-Nasserists were purged from the Syrian military and cabinet. In response, large pro-Nasser riots erupted in Damascus and Aleppo but were crushed with 50 rioters killed. A pro-Nasser coup attempt on 18 July 1963 in Syria also ended unsuccessfully. Hundreds of people were killed or wounded in an attempt to take over the Damascus radio station and army headquarters, and 27 rebel officers were summarily executed. Nasser then formally withdrew from the union agreement, denouncing the Syrian Ba'athists as "fascists and murderers".

In 1964, Egypt, Iraq and North Yemen formed a Unified Political Command in order to prepare the gradual merger in a new United Arab Republic, however, both projects failed in 1966 and 1967. In 1971 and 1972 Muammar Gaddafi attempted to unite Libya, Egypt, Sudan and Syria to form the Federation of Arab Republics. This loose union lasted until 1977 when it split due to political and territorial disputes between the republics' leadership. In 1974, Muammar Gaddafi and Habib Bourguiba attempted their two nations of Libya and Tunisia to form the Arab Islamic Republic. The plan was rejected by Bourgiba due to his realization of the unity of the Maghreb states. This would later become the Arab Maghreb Union.

In October 1978, Iraqi President Ahmed Hassan al-Bakr began working closely with Syrian President Hafez al-Assad to foil the Camp David Accords. They signed a charter in Baghdad for Joint National Action which provided for the "closest form of unity ties" including "complete military unity" as well as "economic, political and cultural unification". An agreement to unify the two states was to come into effect in July 1979. However, Iraqi Vice President Saddam Hussein was fearful of losing his power to Assad (who was supposed to become the deputy leader in the new union) and forced al-Bakr into retirement under threat of violence. Although unity talks did continue between Assad and Saddam after July 1979, but Assad rejected Iraqi demands for a full merger between the two states and for the immediate deployment of Iraqi troops into Syria. Instead Assad, perhaps fearful of Iraqi domination and a new war with Israel, advocated a step-by-step approach. The unity talks were eventually suspended indefinitely after an alleged discovery of a Syrian plot to overthrow Saddam Hussein in November 1979.

== Notable Arab nationalists ==
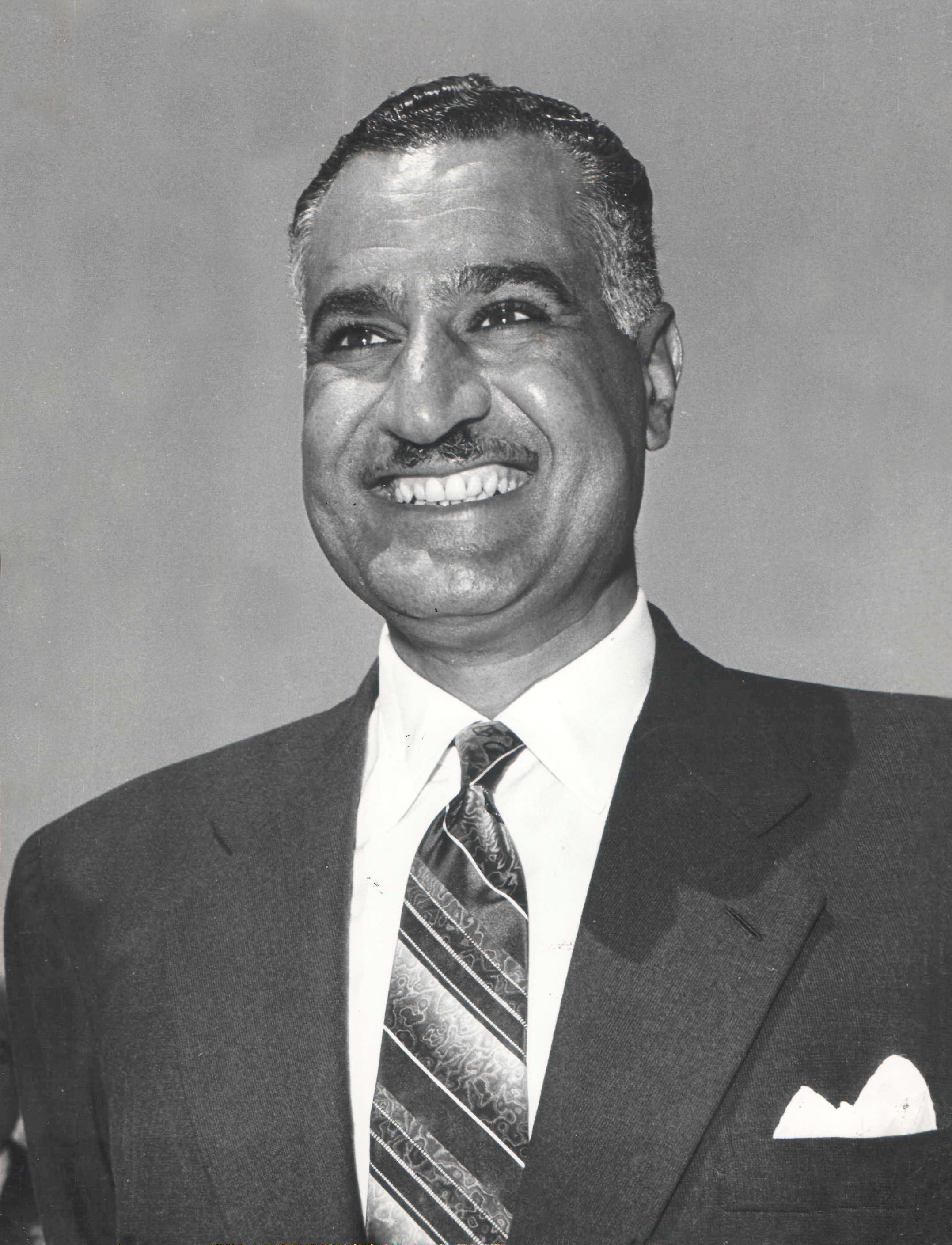
Gamal Abdel Nasser

- Michel Aflaq
- Hussein bin Ali, King of Hejaz
- George Antonius
- Abdul Rahman Arif
- Abdul Salam Arif
- Zaki al-Arsuzi
- Hafez al-Assad
- Ahmed Hassan al-Bakr
- Allal al-Fassi
- Ahmed Ben Bella
- Salah al-Din al-Bitar
- Izzat Darwaza
- Faisal I of Iraq
- Muammar Gaddafi
- Rashid Ali al-Gaylani
- Ghazi of Iraq
- George Habash
- Sati' al-Husri
- Saddam Hussein
- Amin al-Husseini
- Salah Jadid
- Kamal Jumblatt
- Abd al-Rahman al-Kawakibi
- Gamal Abdel Nasser
- Gaafar Nimeiry
- Adnan Pachachi
- Samih al-Qasim
- Shukri al-Quwatli
- Ameen Rihani
- Hamdeen Sabahi
- Jurji Zaydan
- Constantin Zureiq

== See also ==
- Pan-Arabism
- Arab socialism
- Ba'athism
- Coptic nationalism
- Iraqi nationalism
- Jordanian nationalism
- Lebanese nationalism
- Libyan nationalism
- Nasserism
- Palestinian nationalism
- Syrian nationalism
- Tunisian nationalism
