= Arab identity =

Ethnic identity

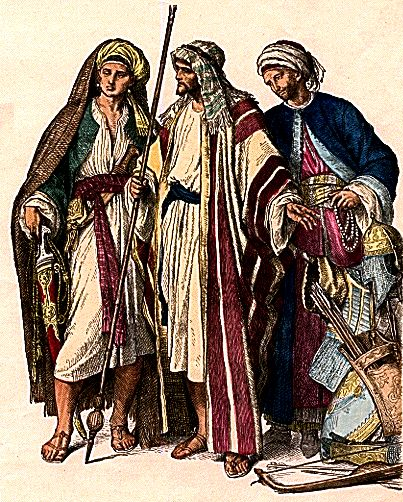
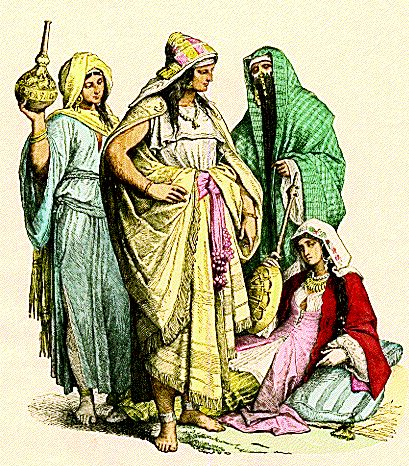
Artistic rendering of pre-Islamic costumes of Arab men and Arab women between fourth to sixth century

Arab identity (Arabic: الهوية العربية) is the objective or subjective conception of perceiving somebody as an Arab and as relating to having Arab ancestry. Like other cultural identities, it relies on a common culture, a traditional lineage, the common land in history, shared experiences including underlying conflicts and confrontations. These commonalities are regional and in historical contexts often tribal.

Arab identity is defined independently of religious identity, and pre-dates the spread of Islam and the earlier spread of Judaism and Christianity, with historically attested Arab Muslim tribes, Arab Christian tribes and Arab Jewish tribes. Arabs are a diverse group in terms of religious affiliations and practices. Most Arabs are Muslims, with a minority adhering to other faiths, largely Christianity, but also Druze and Baháʼí.

Arab identity can also be seen through a lens of national, regional or local identity. Throughout Arab history, there have been several major national trends in the Arab world. Pan-Arabism, for example, rejects the individual Arab states' existing sovereignty as artificial creations and calls for full Arab unity.

== Origins and history ==
The word "Arab" first appears in the early 1st millennium BC, and remains in use until the Islamic era. However, the word evolves considerably over the course of pre-Islamic antiquity, and the evolution and meaning of the term before the rise of Islam continues to be debated.

In Near Eastern sources from the 1st millennium BC, "Arab" is neither an ethnic identifier, a synonym for nomadic or pastoralist groups, or a geographic label associated with the inhabitants of the Arabian Peninsula. Instead, it is an exonym and a socio-cultural identifier for various peoples across Syria, Mesopotamia, the Levant, the Sinai Peninsula, and Egypt, and it could have been used for settled farmers, urban elites, merchants, soldiers, and rulers, as well as pastoral nomads. The term was loosely used for groups of people perceived by Near Eastern sources as broadly sharing in their language and culture. With the ascendance of Greek and Roman sources, which increasingly attempt to systematize the world around them, any region where "Arabs" are found comes to be labeled "Arabia", producing multiple areas simultaneously labelled as "Arabia" across the Near East, far beyond the Peninsula itself. This habit among these sources produced a level of circular reasoning: once a region was labelled "Arabia", its inhabitants, in turn, were labelled as "Arabs", regardless of their own identities.

A more consequential shift occurred under Roman rule, when the Roman Empire annexed the Nabataean Kingdom and created, in its place, an administrative region known as Arabia Petraea in 106 AD. Afterwards, the word "Arab" partially was redefined as an administrative category, tied to residence in the new province, instead of a cultural identity. As a consequence, the term "Saracen" was invented for peoples formerly seen as "Arabs", but living outside of Arabia Petraea. Over time, Greeks and Romans increasingly associated "Arabs" with the incense trade, and acquired a general sense that "Arabs" were peoples living to the south of their own civilizations. As a result, since the Arabian Peninsula broadly fell to the south of Greco-Roman civilization, it in its entirety was misunderstood as "Arabia" over the course of time, even though South Arabians explicitly distinguished themselves from "Arabs" in their own inscriptions at the time. By late antiquity, the concept of Arabia as a unified peninsula inhabited by Arabs was thus largely a construct of Greek and Roman sources. Only much later, with the spread of Arabic through the Muslim conquests, did this geographical idea align with an indigenous criterion of Arab identity based on language.

In the early Islamic period, it was common to invoke "Arab" identity as denoting an elite conqueror status, particularly provided that conversion was uncommon in the first Islamic century. Later, over the course of history, the Arabization of non-Arab societies leading to the adoption of Arab identity with the spread of the Arabic language as well as Islamic religion and culture, took place throughout the Middle East and North Africa.

== Ideology ==
=== Arab nationalism ===
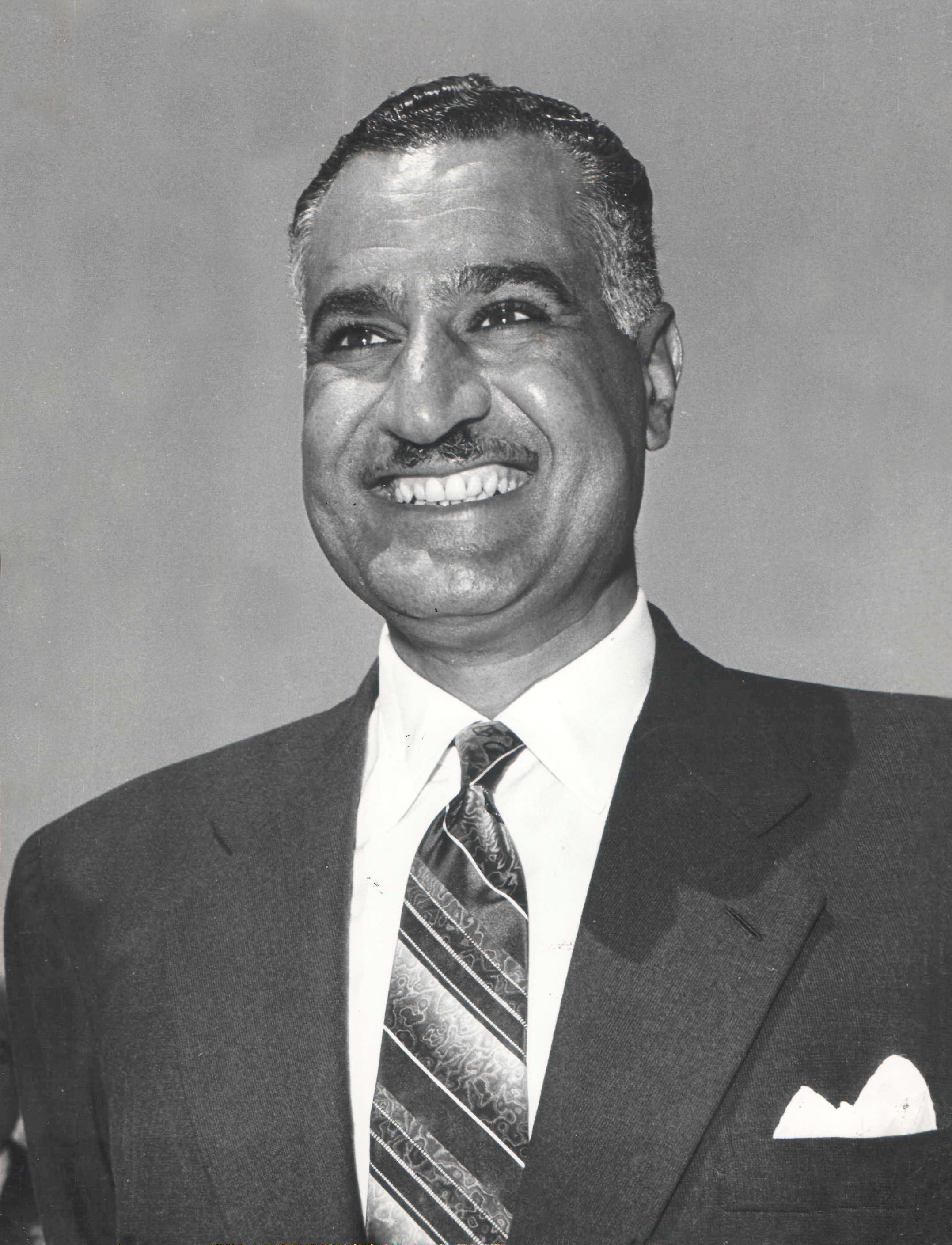
Gamal Abdel Nasser was a symbol and significant player in the rise of Arab nationalism

Arab nationalism is a nationalist ideology that asserts the Arabs are a nation and promotes the unity of Arab people. In its contemporary conception, it is the belief that the Arab people are a people united by language, culture, ethnicity, history, geography and interests, and that one Arab nation comprises the Arabs within its borders from the Atlantic Ocean to the Arabian Sea.

Many Arabs believe that they are an old nation, exhibiting pride, for example, based on Arabic poetry and other forms of Arabic literature. In the era of the spread of Islam, nationalism was manifested by the identification of Arabs as a distinct nation within Islamic countries. In the modern era, this idea was embodied by ideologies such as Nasserism and Ba'athism, which were common forms of nationalism in the Arab world, especially in the mid-twentieth century. Perhaps the most important form of creating such an Arab state was the establishment of the United Arab Republic between Egypt and Syria, although it was short-lived. To some extent, Arab nationalism gained a new popular appeal as a result of the Arab Spring of the 2010s, calling for Arab social unity, led by the people on the streets, not the authoritarian regimes that had installed the historic forms of nationalism.

=== Arab socialism ===
Arab socialism is a political ideology based on an amalgamation between Arab nationalism and socialism. Arab socialism differs from other socialist ideas prevalent in the Arab world. For many, including Michel Aflaq, one of its founders, Arab socialism was a necessary step towards the consolidation of Arab unity and freedoms, since the socialist system of ownership and development alone could overcome the remnants of colonialism in the Arab world.

== Unity ==
=== Pan-Arabism ===
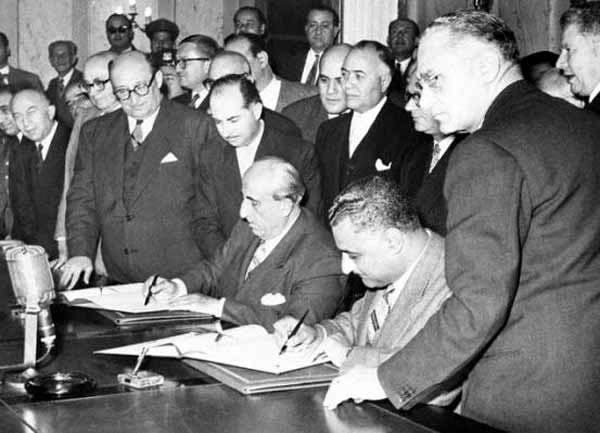
Egyptian president Gamal Abdel Nasser signing unity pact with Syrian president Shukri al-Quwatli, forming the United Arab Republic, February 1958.

Pan-Arabism is an ideology espousing the unification of the countries of North Africa and Middle East from the Atlantic Ocean to the Arabian Sea, often referred to as the Arab world. The idea is based on the integration of some or all of the Arab countries into a single political and economic framework that removes the borders between the Arab states and establishes a strong economic, cultural and military state. Arab unity is an ideology that Arab nationalists see as a solution to the backwardness, occupation and oppression that the Arab citizens in all the individual states are suffering from.

=== Arab League ===
The Arab League, formally the League of Arab States is a regional organization of Arab countries in and around North Africa, the Middle East, the Horn of Africa and the Arabian Peninsula. It was formed in Cairo on 22 March 1945 with six members: Kingdom of Egypt, Kingdom of Iraq, Transjordan (renamed Jordan in 1949), Lebanon, Saudi Arabia, and Syria. Its charter provides for coordination among member states in economic matters, including trade relations, communications, cultural relations, travel documents and permits, social relations and health.

== Definition ==
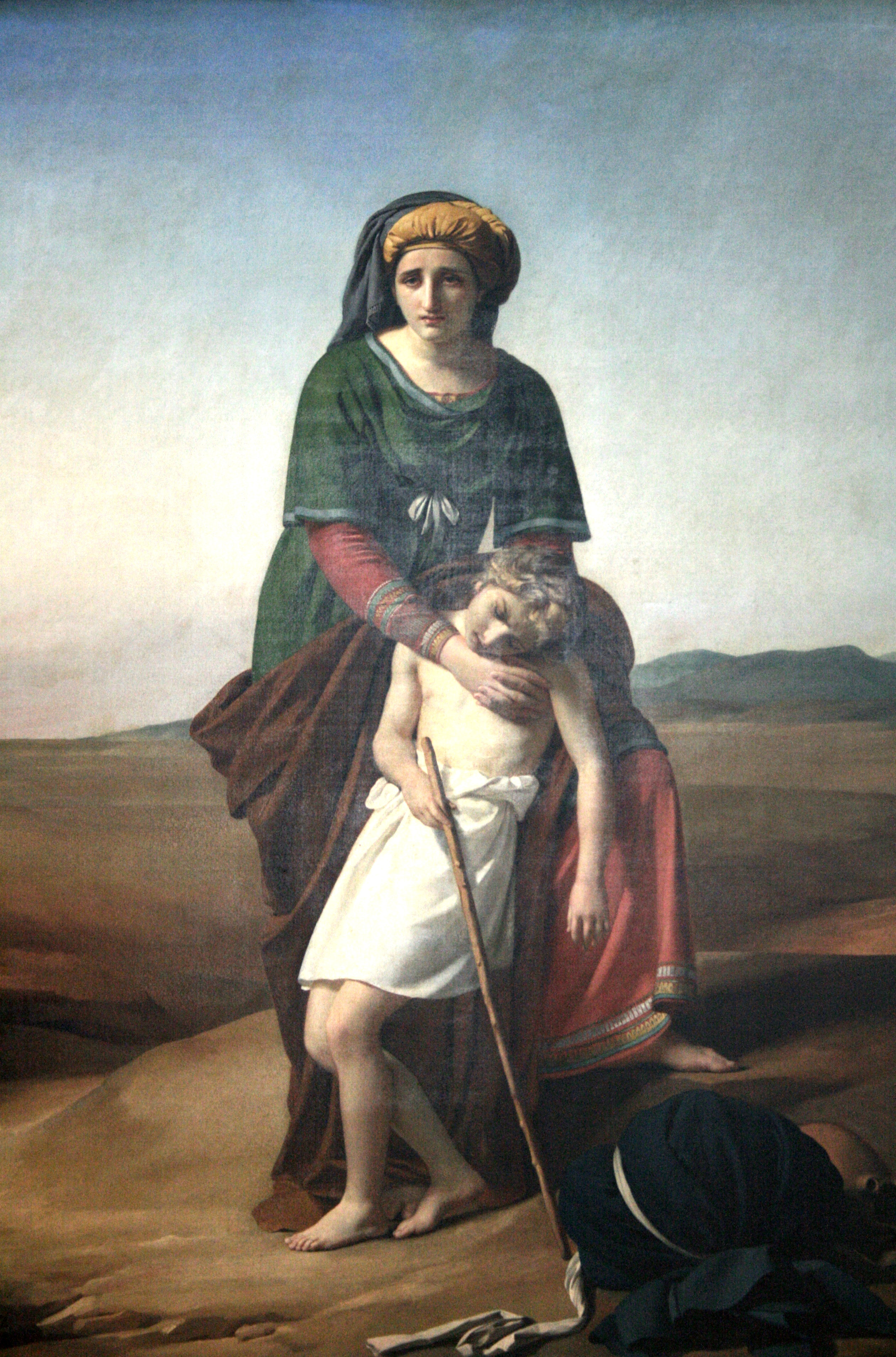
A depiction of Hagar and Ishmael in the Arabian Desert by François-Joseph Navez.

An Arab can be defined as a member of a Semitic people, inhabiting much of the Middle East and North Africa. The ties that bind Arabs may be ethnic, linguistic, cultural, historical, nationalist, geographical, political, often also relating to religion and to cultural identity. In their long history and with many local variations, Arabs have developed their distinct customs, language, architecture, fine art, literature, music, cinema, dance, media, cuisine, dress, societies, and mythology.

According to both Judaism and Islam, Ishmael was the ancestor of the Ishmaelites and of the Arabs. Ishmael was the elder son of Abraham and the forefather of many prominent Arab tribes.

By "Arab" I mean whoever describes himself thus … there, where he is - in his history, his memory, the place where he lives, dies and survives. There, where he is - that is to say, in the experience of a life which is both tolerable and intolerable for him.—Abdelkebir Khatibi

Arabs: name given to the ancient and present-day inhabitants of the Arabian Peninsula and often applied to the peoples closely allied to them in ancestry, language, religion, and culture. Presently more than 200 million Arabs are living mainly in 21 countries; they constitute the overwhelming majority of the population in Saudi Arabia, Syria, Yemen, Jordan, Lebanon, Iraq, Egypt, and the nations of North Africa. The Arabic language is the main symbol of cultural unity among these people, but the religion of Islam provides another common bond for the majority of Arabs.—Encarta Encyclopedia

== Homeland ==
The Arab world, formally the Arab homeland, also known as the Arab nation or the Arab states, currently consists of the 22 Arab countries: Algeria, Bahrain, Comoros, Djibouti, Egypt, Iraq, Jordan, Kuwait, Lebanon, Libya, Mauritania, Morocco, Oman, Palestine, Qatar, Saudi Arabia, Somalia, Sudan, Syria, Tunisia, United Arab Emirates and Yemen. They occupy an area stretching from the Atlantic Ocean in the west to the Arabian Sea in the east, and from the Mediterranean Sea in the north to the Horn of Africa and the Indian Ocean in the southeast. In 2019, the combined population of the Arab world was estimated at 423 million inhabitants.

== Categories ==
Arab identity can be described as consisting of many interconnected parts:

=== Racial ===
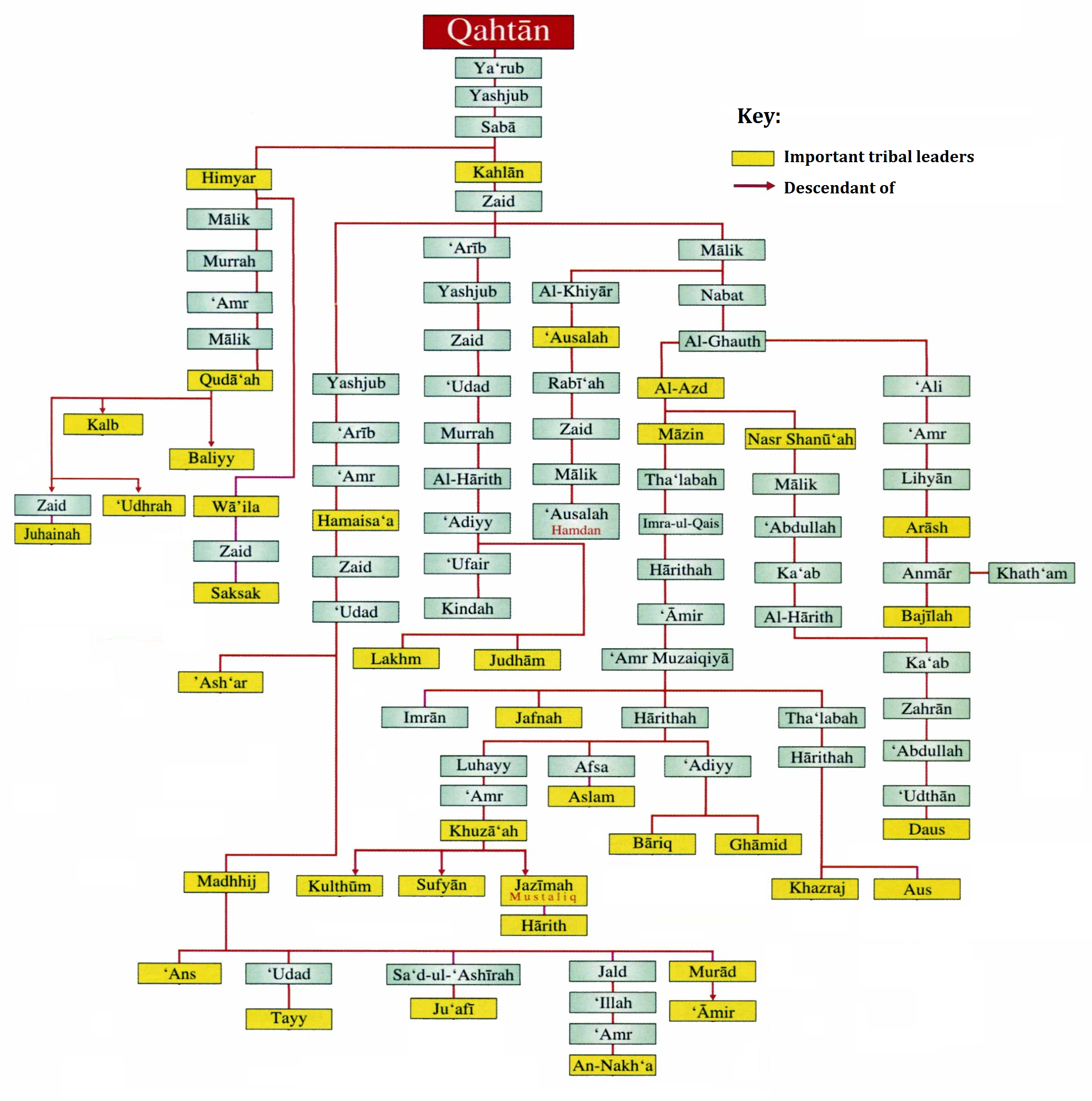
Traditional Qahtanite genealogy.

Based on analysis of the DNA of Semitic-speaking peoples, some recent genetic studies have found Y-chromosomal links between modern Semitic-speaking peoples of the Middle East like Arabs, Hebrews, Mandaeans, Samaritans, and Assyrians.

Medieval Arab genealogists divided Arabs into three groups:

- "Ancient Arabs" tribes that had vanished or been destroyed.
- "Pure Arabs" descending from the Qahtan tribe, who existed before Abraham and Ishmael.
- The "Arabized Arabs" descending from Ishmael, the elder son of Abraham through his marriage to Rala bint Mudad ibn Amr ibn Jurhum, an Arab Qahtani woman. Tribes descending from this alliance are also referred to as Adnani tribes.

Centuries later, the "Arabized Arabs" assumed the name "Pure Arabs" and the "Arabized Arabs" description was attributed to other peoples that joined Islam and created alliances with the Arab tribes.

=== Ethnic ===
An illustrative map showing the distribution of the haplogroup J gene according to the ratios.

Concentrating on ethnic identity is another way of defining Arab identity, which can be subdivided in linguistic, cultural, social, historical, political, national or genealogical terms. In this approach, "being Arab" is based on one or several of the following criteria:

- Genealogy: Someone who can trace his or her paternal descent to the Arab tribes, from the Arabian Desert, Syrian Desert and neighboring areas.
- Self-concept: a person who defines himself as "Arab"
- Attribution of identity: Someone, who is seen by others as an Arab, based on their notions of ethnicity (for example, people of northern Sudan, who can be seen both as African and/or Arab)
- Linguistic: Someone who speaks Arabic especially as a first language, and, by extension, cultural expression, is Arabic.
- Culture: someone who was brought up with Arab culture
- Political: Someone, whose country is a member of the League of Arab States and who shares political associations with the Arab countries. (for example, Somalis and Djiboutians)
- Societal: Someone who lives in or identifies with an Arab society
- Nationality: one who is a national of an Arab state

=== National ===
The flag of the Arab Revolt, its design and colors are the basis of many of the Arab states' flags.

National identity is one's identity or sense of belonging to one state or to one nation. It is the sense of a nation as a cohesive whole, as represented by distinctive traditions, culture, language and politics. Arab nationalism is a nationalist ideology celebrating the glories of Arab civilization, the language and literature of the Arabs, calling for rejuvenation and political union in the Arab world. The premise of Arab nationalism is the need for an ethnic, political, cultural and historical unity among the Arab peoples of the Arab countries. The main objective of Arab nationalism was to achieve the independence of Western influence of all Arab countries. Arab political strategies with the nation in order to determine the struggle of the Arab nation with the state system (nation-state) and the struggle of the Arab nation for unity. The concepts of new nationalism and old nationalism are used in analysis to expose the conflict between nationalism, national ethnic nationalism, and new national political nationalism. These two aspects of national conflicts highlight the crisis known as the Arab Spring, which affects the Arab world today. Suppressing the political struggle to assert the identity of the new civil state is said to clash with the original ethnic identity.

=== Religious ===
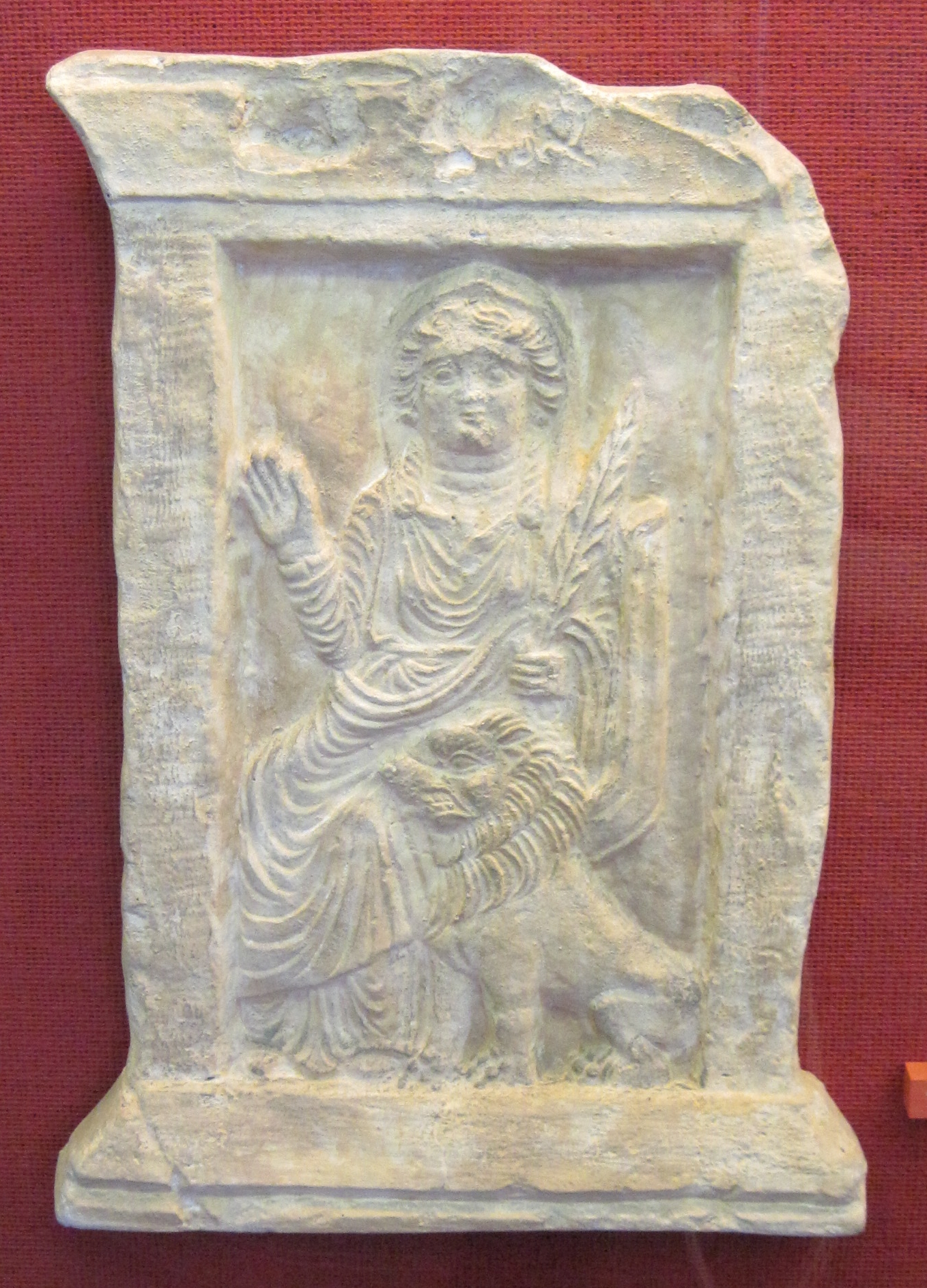
Pre-Islamic Arabian goddess Allāt from the Ba‘alshamîn temple in Palmyra, first century AD

Until about the fourth century, almost all Arabs practised polytheistic religions. Although significant Jewish and Christian minorities developed, polytheism remained the dominant belief system in pre-Islamic, most Arabs followed a pagan religion with a number of deities, including Hubal, Wadd, Allāt, Manat, and Uzza. A few individuals, the hanifs, had apparently rejected polytheism in favor of monotheism unaffiliated with any particular religion. Different theories have been proposed regarding the role of Allah in Meccan religion. Today the majority of Arabs are Muslims, identities are often seen as inseparable. The "Verse of Brotherhood" is the tenth verse of the Quranic chapter "Al-Hujurat", is about brotherhood of believers with each other.

However, there were divergent currents in Pan-Arabism - religious and secular. Ba'athism emerged as a secular countercurrent to the pan-Islamist ambitions of political Islam and the Muslim Brotherhood in the 1960s. Secular nationalism and religious fundamentalism have continued to overcome each other to this day. There are also different religious denominations within Islam leading to sectarian conflict and conflict. In fact, the social and psychological distances between Sunni and Shia Muslims may be greater than the perceived distance between different religions. Because of this, Islam can be seen both as a unification and as a force of division in Arab identity.

=== Cultural ===
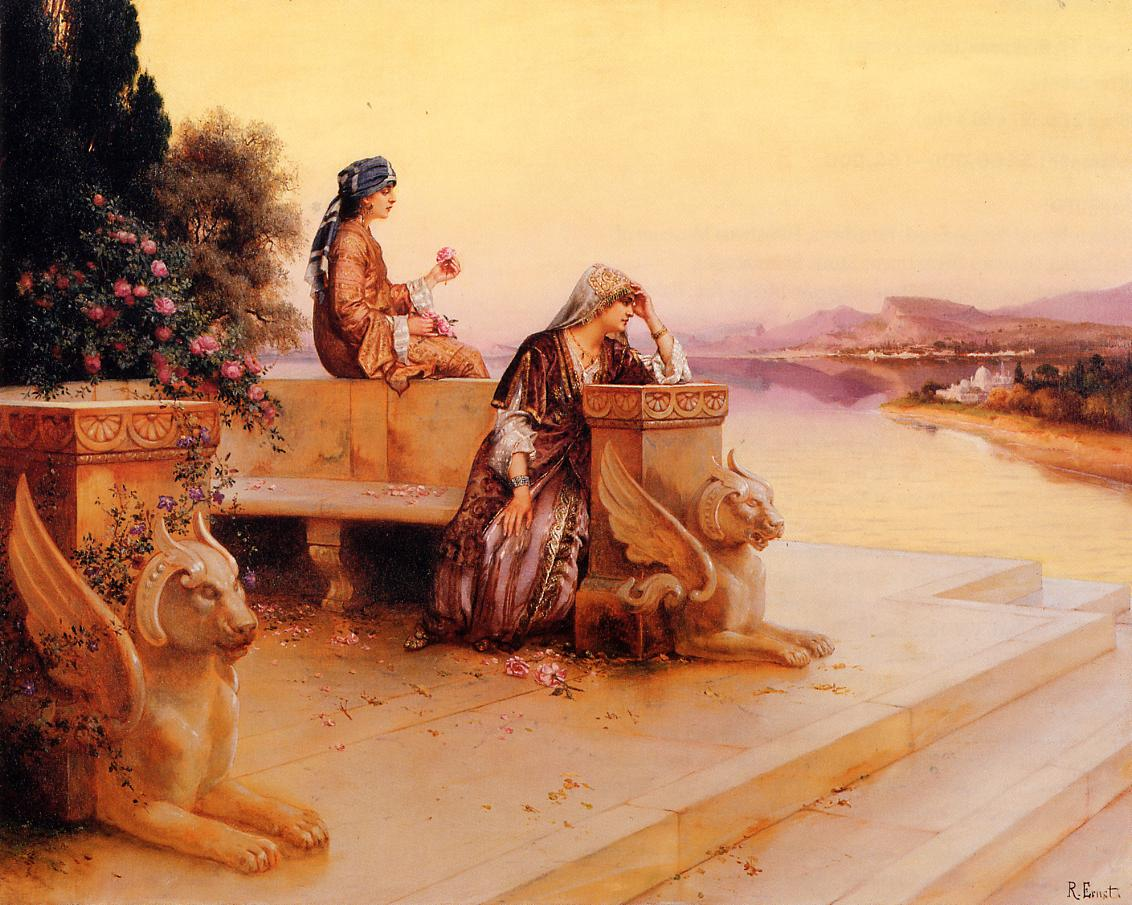
Elegant Arab Ladies on a Terrace at Sunset

Arab cultural identity is characterized by complete uniformity. Arab cultural space are historically tightly interwoven. Arab cultural identity has been assessed through four measures that measure the basic characteristics of Arab culture: religiosity, grouping, belief in gender hierarchy and attitudes toward sexual behavior. The results indicate the predominance of the professional strategies that Arab social workers have learned in their training in social work, while indicating the willingness of social workers to benefit from established strategies in their culture and society, either separately or in combination with the professional. There are different aspects of Arab identity, whether ethnic, religious, national, linguistic or cultural - of different fields and analytical angles.

The family is still at the heart of traditional Arabic letters that the fact that the family is a basic unit of social organization in the traditional Arab contemporary society may explain why it continues to exercise a significant influence on the formation of identity. At the heart of social and economic activities, this institution is still very coherent. Exercise the early and most lasting influence on the person's affiliations.—Halim Barakat

=== Linguistic ===
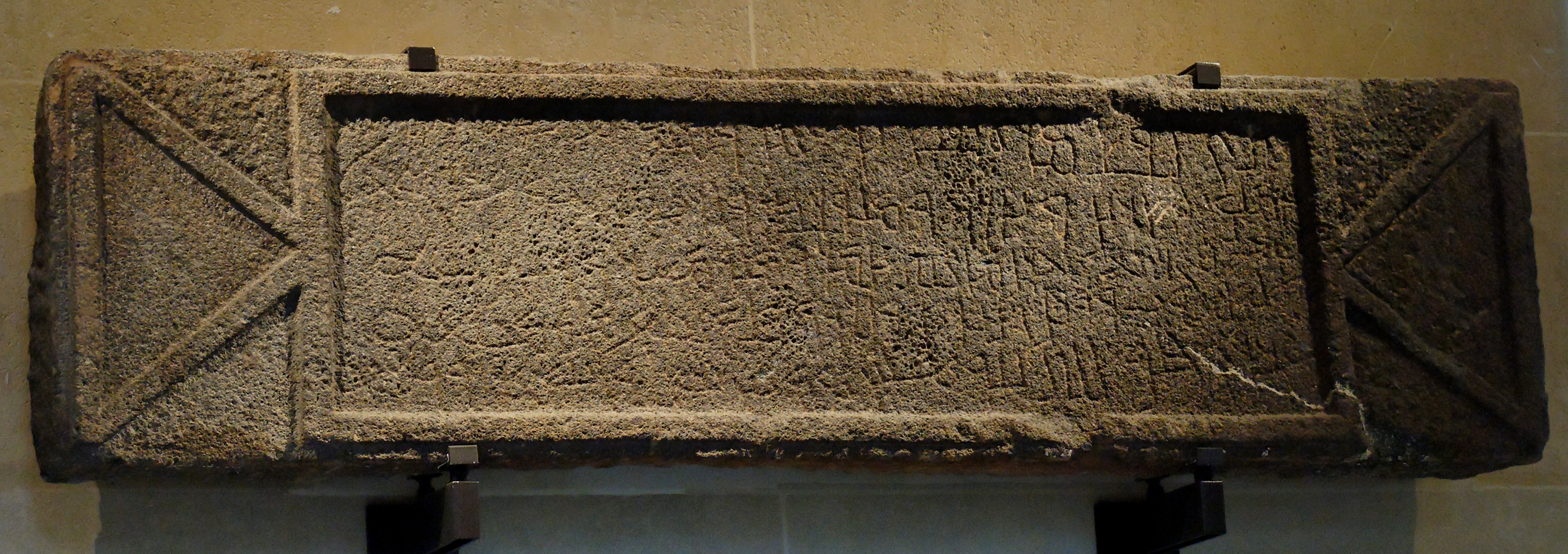
Arabic epitaph of Imru' al-Qays, son of 'Amr, king of all the Arabs", inscribed in Nabataean script. Basalt, dated in 7 Kislul, 223, viz. December 7, 328 AD. Found at Nemara in the Hauran (Southern Syria).

For some Arabs, beyond language, race, religion, tribe or region. Arabic; hence, can be considered as a common factor among all Arabs. Since the Arabic language also exceeds the country's border, the Arabic language helps to create a sense of Arab nationalism. According to the Iraqi world exclusive Cece, "it must be people who speak one language one heart and one soul, so should form one nation and thus one country." There are two sides to the coin, argumentative. While the Arabic language as one language can be a unifying factor, the language is often not united at all. Accents vary from region to region, there are wide differences between written and spoken versions, many countries host bilingual citizens. This leads us to examine other identifying aspects of Arabic identity. Arabic, a Semitic language from the Afroasiatic language family. Modern Standard Arabic serves as the standardized and literary variety of Arabic used in writing, as well as in most formal speech, although it is not used in daily speech by the overwhelming majority of Arabs. Most Arabs who are functional in Modern Standard Arabic acquire it through education and use it solely for writing and formal settings.

=== Political ===
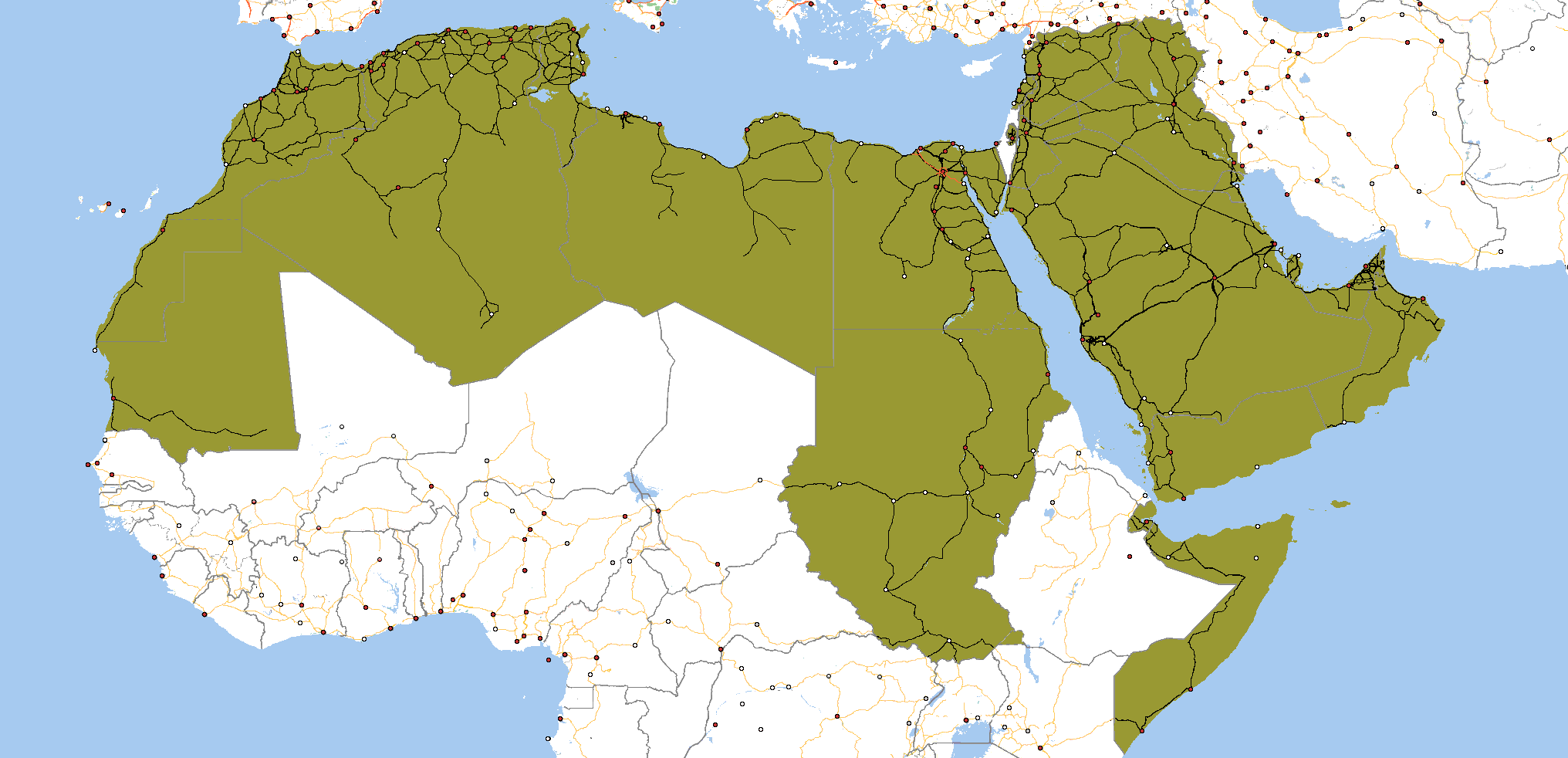
A map of the Arab world.

Arab political identity characterized by restraint, compassion, hospitality, generosity, and proper conduct. Arab countries to redefine politics are linked to the fact that the political culture behind the Arabs has been overrun for centuries by successive political. The vast majority of the citizens of the Arab countries view themselves and are seen by outsiders as "Arabs". Their sense of the Arab nation is based on their common denominators: language, culture, ethnicity, social and political experiences, economic interests and the collective memory of their place and role in history.

The relative importance of these factors is estimated differently by different groups and frequently disputed. Some combine aspects of each definition, as done by Palestinian Habib Hassan Touma:

"One who is a national of an Arab state, has command of the Arabic language, and possesses a fundamental knowledge of Arab tradition, that is, of the manners, customs, and political and social systems of the culture.

The Arab League, a regional organization of countries intended to encompass the Arab world, defines an Arab as:

An Arab is a person whose language is Arabic, who lives in an Arab country, and who is in sympathy with the aspirations of the Arab peoples.

== See also ==
- Pan-Arabism
- Arab diaspora
- Arab world
- Arab nationalism
- Arab culture
- Cultural identity
- Ethnogenesis
- Group identity
- Identity (social science)
- Identity politics
- National identity
- Passing (racial identity)
- Self-concept
- Social identity
