= 2001 Arab League summit =

Thirteenth Arab League summit
- Host country: Jordan
- Dates: March 2001
- City: Amman
- Follows: 1996 Arab League summit
- Precedes: 2002 Arab League summit

The 2001 Arab League Summit was the thirteenth summit of the Arab League held in Amman, Jordan from March 27th to the 28th. The summit was hosted amidst the context of the Second Intifada and U.N imposed sanctions on Iraq in the aftermath of the Gulf War. The summit ended with a resolution endorsing Palestinian resistance and calling for both Iraq and Kuwait to cease hostilities and exchange prisoners. The resolution also promised $180 million in loans over six months to the Palestinians. Despite calling for an end to the U.N imposed sanctions, no formula or method for ending those sanctions was agreed upon, due to Iraq refusing to comply with the U.N's demands. Western sources described the outcome of the summit as comparatively "restrained".
