= Lists of the Arab League =

This is a list of lists relating to the Arab League.

- List of conflicts in the Arab League
  - List of modern conflicts in the Middle East
  - List of modern conflicts in North Africa
  - List of conflicts in Somalia
- Demographics of the Arab world
  - List of largest cities in the Arab world
  - List of Arab League countries by population
  - List of Arab League countries by GDP (nominal), a list using the current exchange rates for national currencies
  - List of Arab League countries by GDP (PPP), a list using purchasing power parity to derive GDP estimates
- List of mosques in the Arab League
