= 1969 Arab League summit =

Arab League summit

Fifth Arab League summit
- Host country: Morocco
- Dates: December 21 – 23, 1969
- Cities: Rabat
- Follows: 1967 Arab League summit
- Precedes: 1973 Arab League summit

The 1969 Arab League summit was the fifth Arab League summit, held from December 21st-23rd in Rabat, Morocco.

The conference took place in the midst of both the Arab Cold War and the War of Attrition waged between Israel and Arab neighbors, as well as the PLO. Among the items planned to be discussed was a proposed Egyptian three-year plan for military mobilization against Israel, increased support for Palestinian militias (Fedayeen), and financial aid to Palestinians in the occupied areas. The meeting ended in failure after Gamal Abdel Nasser of Egypt, then the United Arab Republic, walked out on the 23rd after Saudi Arabia, Kuwait, Algeria, Morocco, and Tunisia were unable to pledge themselves financially to the proposed war effort. According to some reports, Nasser stormed out after, in response to his request for funding, King Faisal of Saudi Arabia challenged Nasser to account for how he spent the money provided by the monarchy since 1967.
