= General Arab Insurance Federation =

The General Arab Insurance Federation was established in September 1964 after a treaty was signed in Cairo, Egypt, in response to demands for such an organization by insurance companies. The headquarters of the Federation has also been in Cairo since 1964. The Secretary General of the Organization is Dr. Abdel Khalik Raouf Khalil, born in Iraq. The General Arab Insurance Federation's (GAIF) main goal is to improve and encourage inner Arab Communication between Insurance sectors, and to develop the Insurance industry in the Arab States.

== Members ==
It has 20 Arab members practicing its laws, all members in the Arab League, only Comoros and Djibouti have not signed the Agreement of the Federation. 268 insurance companies are members of the GAIF in the Arab states.

== Working councils ==
The Federation works and functions by the following councils

- General Summit.
- Federation Council
- Executive committee.
- General Secretariat.
- Specialized Private Committees.

== Achievements ==
Integration of Arab Economic and Insurance Markets

- Including the GAIF in the GAFTA's Economic Plans.
- Integrating the Legalized laws of insurance in the Arab States.
- continue establishing cooperative Insurance Companies between Members.

Achieved Projects

- Arabizing the Insurance Language.
- Creating an Arab Orange Card.
- Arab Insurance Self Sufficiency.
- Creating a Unified ID system for Cars across the Arab States.
