= 2013 Arab League summit =

Meeting of Arab regional organization

Arab League summit قمة جامعة الدول العربية
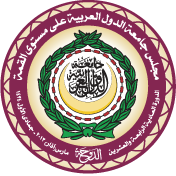
- Arab League summit emblem
- Host country: Qatar
- Date: March 21, 2013
- Cities: Doha
- Venues: Sheraton Doha
- Website: Official Website

The 2013 Arab League Summit was held in Doha, Qatar from 21 to 27 March 2013.

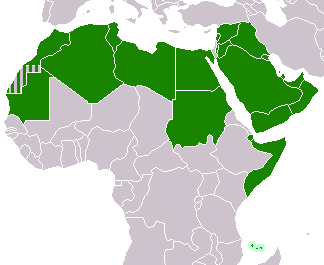
Map of League of Arab countries

On 26 March, the League recognised the National Coalition for Syrian Revolutionary and Opposition Forces, as the legitimate representatives of the Syrian people. The National Coalition was henceforth granted Damascus' seat at the summit. This act of recognition was opposed by Algeria, Iraq & Lebanon.
