= 1973 Arab League summit =

Sixth Arab League summit
- Host country: Algeria
- Dates: Nov 26th-28th 1973
- City: Algiers
- Follows: 1969 Arab League summit
- Precedes: 1974 Arab League summit

The 1973 Arab League summit was the sixth Arab League summit, held from November 26th–28th in Algiers, Algeria. The conference took place shortly after the Yom Kippur War in October of that year. It was attended by 16 Arab countries, but boycotted by Iraq and Libya. The summit also saw the accession of the Republic of Mauritania as a formal member of the Arab League.

The final resolution denounced the "aggression and fait accompli" policies of Israel, established formal recognition of the sole legitimacy of the PLO, and pledged continued support for the Palestinian people for the sake of Arab unity. The summit also called upon Israel to relinquish its occupation of all territories taken after the Six-Day War of 1967, including Jerusalem. In addition, the Arab League made several initiatives in private to further Arab and Islamic unity and push the Palestinian cause.
