= 1974 Arab League summit =

Meeting of Arab regional organization

Seventh Arab League summit
- Host country: Morocco
- Date: October 1974
- Cities: Rabat
- Chair: King Hassan II of Morocco
- Follows: 1973 Arab League summit
- Precedes: 1976 Arab League summit (Riyadh)

The 1974 Arab League summit was a meeting of the Arab League held in Rabat, Morocco, in October 1974. Leaders of twenty Arab countries were present, including King Hussein of Jordan and Anwar Sadat of Egypt, together with representatives of the Palestine Liberation Organization (PLO).

A unanimous resolution was passed, which, for the first time, declared the PLO to be the "sole legitimate representative of the Palestinian people". Furthermore, the Arab League resolved that the "oil-rich Arab states ... [provide] multi-annual financial aid to the [states in confrontation with Israel] and the PLO."

The summit shaped the future of the conflict in several ways. First, it forced King Hussein of Jordan to relinquish his claim to be able to speak for the Palestinians and to acknowledge that a future Palestinian state would have to be independent of Jordan. Second, it weakened the position of the United States, whose secretary of state, Henry Kissinger, preferred Hussein over the PLO.

A Fatah plot to assassinate Hussein upon his arrival to the summit was uncovered by Moroccan Authorities.

== See also ==
- Arab League boycott of Israel
