= Joint Arab Economic Action Charter =

The Joint Arab Economic Charter was established on June 3, 1957 by decision No. 85 of the (CAEU) Council of Arab Economic Unity of the Arab League, a regional organization in the Arab world.
