= 2002 Arab League summit =

Meeting of Arab regional organization

Arab League Summit
- Host country: Lebanon
- Date: March 28, 2002
- Cities: Beirut

The Beirut Summit (also known as the Arab Summit Conference) was a meeting of the Arab League in Beirut, Lebanon, in March 2002 to discuss the Israeli–Palestinian conflict. At the time Yasser Arafat, the Leader of Palestine, was under house-arrest in his Ramallah compound. The Israeli forces confined him and prevented him from attending the Beirut Summit.

The meeting became especially noteworthy for the adoption, by the Arab states attending, of a proposal offering a comprehensive peace between the Arab countries and Israel, called the Arab Peace Initiative.

== Arab Peace Initiative ==
The Arab Peace Initiative was floated by then acting Saudi regent Crown Prince Abdullah as a potential solution to both the Israeli–Palestinian conflict and the Arab–Israeli conflict. It was published on March 28, 2002, during the meeting of the Arab League at the Beirut Summit and achieved the unanimous consent of all members of the Arab League.

Considered as a progressive proposal, it calls for the state of Israel to withdraw all its forces from all the Occupied Territories, including the Golan Heights, to officially recognize "an independent Palestinian state with East Jerusalem as its capital" in the West Bank and Gaza Strip, as well as a "just solution" for the Palestinian refugees. In exchange the Arab states affirmed that they would recognize the state of Israel, consider the Arab-Israeli conflict over and establish "normal relations" with Israel.

The initiative is based upon:

- The principle of land for peace.
- The conviction of the Arab countries that a military solution to the conflict will not achieve peace or provide security for the parties.

The proposal, from Saudi Arabia, offered Israel recognition by the Arab countries, including into Peace agreements and normalization of relations if Israel would:

- withdraw from all territories occupied by Israel since the 1967 Six-Day War,
- provide a just solution to the Palestinian refugee problem, and
- recognize the establishment of a sovereign and independent Palestinian state in the West Bank and Gaza Strip.

The goals of the initiative are:

- Full Israeli withdrawal from all the Arab territories occupied since June 1967.
- Implementation of United Nations Security Council resolutions 242 and 338.
- The establishment of an independent Palestinian state, with East Jerusalem as its capital.
- A just solution to the Palestinian Refugee problem, to be agreed upon in accordance with section 11 of UN General Assembly Resolution 194.
- The normalization of relations in the context of a comprehensive Peace.

Jordan's Foreign Minister stated:

The Arab initiative put forth at the Beirut Summit in March offers comprehensive peace in the region based on the internationally recognized formulation of "land for peace" – a return to June 4, 1967, borders in exchange for normal relations and a collective peace treaty.

In response, Israeli Foreign Minister Shimon Peres welcomed it and said: "... the details of every peace plan must be discussed directly between Israel and the Palestinians, and to make this possible, the Palestinian Authority must put an end to terror, the horrifying expression of which we witnessed just last night in Netanya," referring to Netanya suicide attack perpetrated on previous evening which the Beirut Summit has failed to address.

The somewhat obscure 4th section was inserted at Lebanese insistence and reflects its concern that the settlement of the refugee problem not be at what it considers the expense of Lebanon and its "demographic balance."

Lebanon and Syria campaigned for the inclusion of a reference to United Nations Resolution 194, which emphasizes the Palestinian right of return to Israel. A compromise was eventually reached, citing the resolution but stating that the League would support any agreement between Israel and Palestinians on the issue.

== Arab–Israeli peace diplomacy and treaties ==
- Paris Peace Conference, 1919
- Faisal–Weizmann Agreement (1919)
- 1949 Armistice Agreements
- Camp David Accords (1978)
- Egypt–Israel peace treaty (1979)
- Madrid Conference of 1991
- Oslo Accords (1993)
- Israel–Jordan peace treaty (1994)
- Camp David 2000 Summit
- Israeli–Palestinian peace process
- Projects working for peace among Israelis and Arabs
- List of Middle East peace proposals
- International law and the Arab–Israeli conflict
