= Arab League =

Regional organisation

League of Arab States: جامعة الدول العربية (Arabic) Jāmiʿat ad-Duwal al-ʿArabiyya
- Flag Emblem

- Member states shown in dark green
- Headquarters: Cairo, Egypt (Note: From 1979 to 1990, Tunis, Tunisia.)
- Official languages: Arabic
- Type: Regional organisation
- Members: Algeria; Bahrain; Comoros; Djibouti; Egypt; Iraq; Jordan; Kuwait; Lebanon; Libya; Mauritania; Morocco; Oman; Palestine; Qatar; Saudi Arabia; Somalia; Sudan; Syria; Tunisia; United Arab Emirates; Yemen

Leaders
  - Secretary-General: Nabil Fahmy
  - Parliament Speaker: Mohammed Al-Yamahi
- Legislature: Arab Parliament

Establishment
  - Alexandria Protocol: 22 March 1945
  - Joint Defence and Economic Co-operation Treaty: 18 June 1950
  - Casablanca Protocol: 11 September 1965
  - Agreement for Judicial Cooperation: 6 April 1983
  - Greater Free Trade Area: 2 January 2005

Area
  - Total area: 13,132,327 km^{2} (5,070,420 sq mi) (2nd)

Population
  - 2025 estimate: 481,233,000 (3rd)
  - Density: 36.64/km^{2} (94.9/sq mi)
- GDP (PPP): 2025 estimate
  - Total: $9.423 trillion
  - Per capita: $19,581
- GDP (nominal): 2025 estimate
  - Total: $3.546 trillion (7th)
  - Per capita: $7,369
- Currency: (Algeria) Algerian dinar; (Bahrain) Bahraini dinar; (Comoros) Comorian franc; (Djibouti) Djiboutian franc; (Egypt) Egyptian pound; (Iraq) Iraqi dinar; (Jordan) Jordanian dinar; (Kuwait) Kuwaiti dinar; (Lebanon) Lebanese pound; (Libya) Libyan dinar; (Mauritania) Mauritanian ouguiya; (Morocco) Moroccan dirham; (Oman) Omani rial; (Qatar) Qatari riyal; (Saudi Arabia) Saudi riyal; (Somalia) Somali shilling; (Sudan) Sudanese pound; (Syria) Syrian pound; (Tunisia) Tunisian dinar; (United Arab Emirates) UAE dirham; (Yemen) Yemeni rial
- Time zone: UTC+0 to +4
- Website leagueofarabstates.org

The Arab League, (Note: Arabic: الجامعة العربية, romanized: al-Jāmiʿa al-ʻArabiyya; [al.d͡ʒaː.mi.ʕa al.ʕa.ra.bij.ja]) officially the League of Arab States, (Note: Arabic: جامعة الدول العربية, romanized: Jāmiʿat ad-Duwal al-ʿArabiyya) is a regional organisation in the Arab world. The Arab League was formed in Cairo on 22 March 1945, initially with seven members: Egypt, Iraq, Transjordan, Lebanon, Saudi Arabia, Syria, and North Yemen. Currently, the League has 22 members, including three non-Arab countries, namely Comoros, Djibouti and Somalia.

The League's main goal is to "draw closer the relations between member states and co-ordinate collaboration between them, to safeguard their independence and sovereignty, and to consider in a general way the affairs and interests of the Arab countries". The organisation has received a relatively low level of cooperation throughout its history.

Through institutions, notably the Arab League Educational, Cultural and Scientific Organization (ALECSO) and the Economic and Social Council of its Council of Arab Economic Unity (CAEU), the League facilitates political, economic, cultural, scientific, and social programmes designed to promote the interests of the Arab world. It has served as a forum for the member states to coordinate policy, arrange studies of and committees as to matters of common concern, settle inter-state disputes and limit conflicts such as the 1958 Lebanon crisis. The League has served as a platform for the drafting and conclusion of many landmark documents promoting economic integration. One example is the Joint Arab Economic Action Charter, which outlines the principles for economic activities in the region.

Each member state has one vote in the Council of the Arab League, and decisions are binding only for those states that have voted for them. The aims of the league in 1945 were to strengthen and coordinate the political, cultural, economic and social programmes of its members and to mediate disputes among them or between them and third parties. Furthermore, the signing of an agreement on Joint Defence and Economic Cooperation on 13 April 1950 committed the signatories to coordination of military defence measures. In March 2015, the Arab League General Secretary announced the establishment of a Joint Arab Force with the aim of counteracting extremism and other threats to the Arab States. The decision was reached while Operation Decisive Storm was intensifying in Yemen. Participation in the project is voluntary, and the army intervenes only at the request of one of the member states. Existing military cooperation between Arab league states and regional civil wars and terrorist threats were the impetuses for JAF's establishment.

In the early 1970s, the Economic Council put forward a proposal to create the Joint Arab Chambers of Commerce across international states. That led to the setting up of mandates to promote, encourage and facilitate bilateral trade between the Arab world and significant trading partners.

== History ==
Following adoption of the Alexandria Protocol in 1944, the Arab League was founded on 22 March 1945. The official headquarters of the League was the Boustan Palace in Cairo. It aimed to be a regional organisation of Arab states with a focus to developing the economy, resolving disputes and coordinating political aims. Other countries later joined the league. Each country was given one vote in the council. The first major action was joint intervention to keep Palestine from being divided into two states in keeping with the decision of the United Nations General Assembly. When Transjordan agreed to this proposal, Egypt intervened to prevent this from happening. It was followed by the creation of a mutual defence treaty two years later. A common market was established in 1965.

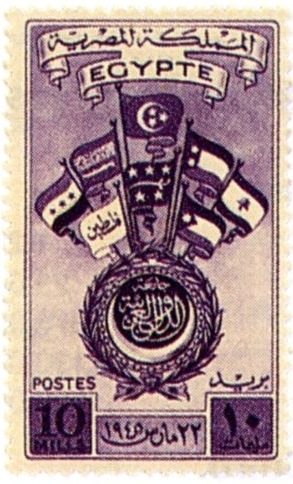
Arab League of states establishment memorial stamp. Showing flags of the 8 establishing countries: Kingdom of Egypt, Kingdom of Saudi Arabia, Kingdom of Yemen, Syrian Republic, Hashemite Kingdom of Iraq, Hashemite Kingdom of Jordan, Lebanese Republic and Palestine

According to Michael Barnett and Etel Solingen, the Arab League "has achieved a relatively low level of cooperation" throughout its history. They state that the design of the Arab League reflects Arab leaders' individual concerns for regime survival: "the politics of Arab nationalism and a shared identity led Arab states to embrace the rhetoric of Arab unity in order to legitimize their regimes, and to fear Arab unity in practice because it would impose greater restrictions on their sovereignty." The Arab League was "specifically designed to fail at producing the kind of greater collaboration and integration that might have weakened political leaders at home."

== Geography ==
Joining dates of member states; the Comoros (circled) joined in 1993. 1940s 1950s 1960s 1970s

The Arab League member states cover over 13,000,000 km^{2} (5,000,000 sq mi) and straddles two continents: Africa and Asia. The area largely consists of arid deserts, such as the Sahara. Nevertheless, it also contains several highly fertile lands like the Nile Valley, the Jubba Valley and Shebelle Valley in the Horn of Africa, the Atlas Mountains in the Maghreb, and the Fertile Crescent that stretches over Mesopotamia and the Levant. The area comprises deep forests in southern Arabia and parts of the world's longest river, the Nile.

== Membership ==
The Charter of the Arab League, also known as the Pact of the League of Arab States, is the founding treaty of the Arab League. Adopted in 1945, it stipulates that "the League of Arab States shall be composed of the independent Arab States that have signed this Pact."

In 1945, there were seven members, but the Arab League now has 22 members, including 10 African countries:

- Algeria
- Bahrain
- Comoros
- Djibouti
- Egypt
- Iraq
- Jordan
- Kuwait
- Lebanon
- Libya
- Mauritania
- Morocco
- Oman
- Palestine
- Qatar
- Saudi Arabia
- Somalia
- Sudan
- Syria
- Tunisia
- United Arab Emirates
- Yemen

and 8 observer states (note: the observer states below have been invited to participate during select Arab League sessions but do not hold voting privileges):

- Armenia
- Brazil
- Chad
- Eritrea
- Greece
- India
- Venezuela
- Austria

=== Suspensions ===
Egypt was suspended from the Arab League on 26 March 1979 due to the Egypt–Israel peace treaty, with the League's headquarters moving from Cairo to Tunis, Tunisia. In 1987, Arab League states restored diplomatic relations with Egypt, the country was readmitted to the League in May 1989 and the League's headquarters were moved back to Cairo in September 1990.

Libya was suspended on 22 February 2011, following the outbreak of the first Libyan civil war. The Arab League voted to restore Libya's membership on 27 August 2011 by accrediting a representative of the National Transitional Council, which was the partially recognised interim government of the country.

Syria was suspended on 16 November 2011 in the aftermath of the outbreak of the Syrian civil war. On 6 March 2013, the Arab League gave Syria's seat in the Arab League to the Syrian National Coalition, the largest opposition group. On 9 March 2014, secretary general Nabil Elaraby stated that Syria's seat would remain vacant until the opposition completed the formation of its institutions. In 2021, the Arab League initiated a process of normalisation between the Syrian Ba'athist government and other Arab nations. On 7 May 2023, at the meeting of the Council of the Arab League in Cairo, it was agreed to reinstate Syria's membership.

== Politics and administration ==
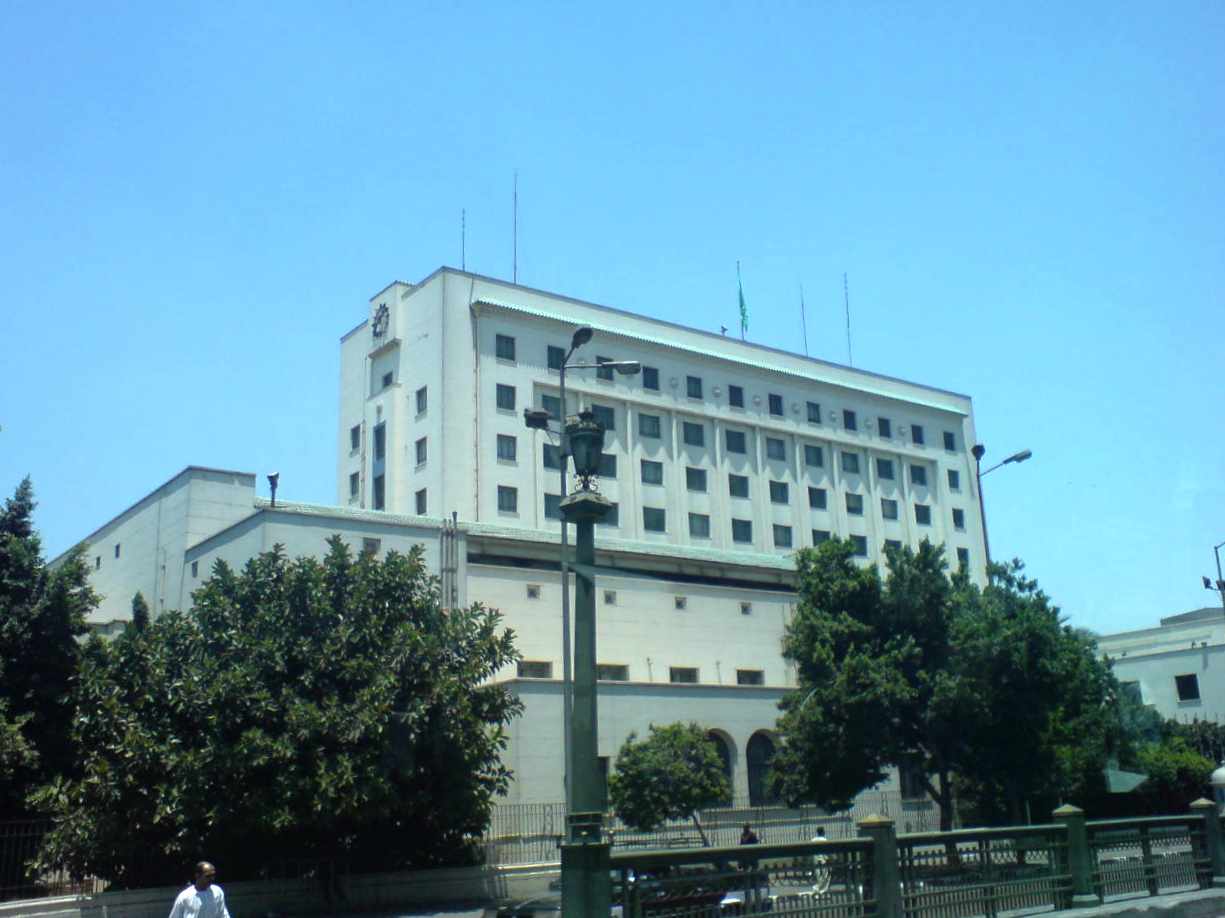
Headquarters of the Arab League, Cairo.

Recognition of both Israel and Palestinian State Recognition of Palestinian State only

The Arab League is a political organisation which tries to help integrate its members economically, and solve conflicts involving member states without asking for foreign assistance. It possesses elements of a state representative parliament while foreign affairs are often conducted under UN supervision.

The Charter of the Arab League endorsed the principle of an Arab nation-state while respecting the sovereignty of the individual member states. The internal regulations of the Council of the League and the committees were agreed in October 1951. Those of the Secretariat-General were agreed in May 1953.

Since then, governance of the Arab League has been based on the duality of supra-national institutions and the sovereignty of the member states. Preservation of individual statehood derived its strengths from the natural preference of ruling elites to maintain their power and independence in decision making. Moreover, feuds among Arab rulers, and the influence of external powers that might oppose Arab unity can be seen as obstacles towards a deeper integration of the league.

Mindful of their previous announcements in support of the Arabs of Palestine the framers of the Pact were determined to include them within the League from its inauguration. This was done by means of an annex that declared:

Even though Palestine was not able to control her own destiny, it was on the basis of the recognition of her independence that the Covenant of the League of Nations determined a system of government for her. Her existence and her independence among the nations can, therefore, no more be questioned de jure than the independence of any of the other Arab States. [...] Therefore, the States signatory to the Pact of the Arab League consider that in view of Palestine's special circumstances, the Council of the League should designate an Arab delegate from Palestine to participate in its work until this country enjoys actual independence

In September 1963, the Arab League appointed Ahmad Shukeiri as Representative of Palestine at the Arab League. At the Cairo Summit of 1964, the Arab League initiated the creation of an organisation representing the Palestinian people. The first Palestinian National Council convened in East Jerusalem on 29 May 1964. The Palestine Liberation Organization was founded during this meeting on 2 June 1964. Palestine was shortly admitted in to the Arab League, represented by the PLO. Today, State of Palestine is a full member of the Arab League.

At the Beirut Summit on 28 March 2002, the league adopted the Arab Peace Initiative, a Saudi-inspired peace plan for the Arab–Israeli conflict. The initiative offered full normalisation of the relations with Israel. In exchange, Israel was required to withdraw from all occupied territories, including the Golan Heights, to recognise Palestinian independence in the West Bank and Gaza Strip, with East Jerusalem as its capital, as well as a "just solution" for the Palestinian refugees. The Peace Initiative was again endorsed at 2007 in the Riyadh Summit. In July 2007, the Arab League sent a mission, consisting of the Jordanian and Egyptian foreign ministers, to Israel to promote the initiative. Following Venezuela's move to expel Israeli diplomats amid the 2008–2009 Israel–Gaza conflict, Kuwaiti member of parliament Waleed Al-Tabtabaie proposed moving Arab League headquarters to Caracas, Venezuela. On 13 June 2010, Amr Mohammed Moussa, Secretary-General of the Arab League, visited the Gaza Strip, the first visit by an official of the Arab League since Hamas' armed takeover in 2007.

The Arab League is a member of the China-Arab States Cooperation Forum (CASCF), which was formed in 2004. CASCF is the Arab League's earliest participation in a cooperation forum with another country or region. CASCF is the primarily multi-lateral coordination mechanism between the Arab states and China and within CASCF the Arab League represents its member states as a relatively unified force. The Arab League's coordination allows Arab states to negotiate actively for collective projects involving multiple states, such as railway projects, nuclear power projects, and Dead Sea initiatives.

In 2015, the Arab League voiced support for Saudi Arabian-led military intervention in Yemen against the Shia Houthis and forces loyal to former President Ali Abdullah Saleh, who was deposed in the 2011 uprising.

On 15 April 2018, in response to the Turkish invasion of northern Syria aimed at ousting U.S.-backed Syrian Kurds from the enclave of Afrin, the Arab League passed a resolution calling on Turkish forces to withdraw from Afrin.

In September 2019, the Arab League condemned Benjamin Netanyahu's plans to annex the eastern portion of the occupied West Bank known as the Jordan Valley.

The Arab League met in Cairo on 12 October 2019 to discuss the Turkish offensive into north-eastern Syria. Upon meeting, its member states voted to condemn the Turkish offensive, dubbing it both an 'invasion' and an 'aggression' against an Arab state, adding that the organisation saw it as a violation of international law.

On 9 September 2020, the Arab League refused to condemn the UAE's decision to normalise ties with Israel. Nevertheless, "the goal all our Arab countries seek, without exception, is to end the occupation and establish an independent Palestinian state on the 1967 borders with East Jerusalem as its capital," Aboul Gheit said. In January 2024, the Arab League expressed support for South Africa's ICJ genocide case against Israel.

== List of summits ==
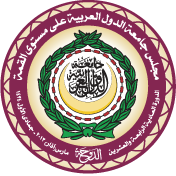
2013 Arab League Summit Logo

No.	Date	Host country	Host city
1	13–17 January 1964	United Arab Republic	Cairo
2	5–11 September 1964	United Arab Republic	Alexandria
3	13–17 September 1965	Morocco	Casablanca
4	29 August 1967	Sudan	Khartoum
5	21–23 December 1969	Morocco	Rabat
6	26–28 November 1973	Algeria	Algiers
7	29 October 1974	Morocco	Rabat
8	25–26 October 1976	Egypt	Cairo
9	2–5 November 1978	Iraq	Baghdad
10	20–22 November 1979	Tunisia	Tunis
11	21–22 November 1980	Jordan	Amman
12	6–9 September 1982	Morocco	Fes
13	1985	Morocco	Casablanca
14	1987	Jordan	Amman
15	June 1988	Algeria	Algiers
16	1989	Morocco	Casablanca
17	1990	Iraq	Baghdad
18	1996	Egypt	Cairo
19	27–28 March 2001	Jordan	Amman
20	27–28 March 2002	Lebanon	Beirut
21	1 March 2003	Egypt	Sharm el-Sheikh
22	22–23 May 2004	Tunisia	Tunis
23	22–23 March 2005	Algeria	Algiers
24	28–30 March 2006	Sudan	Khartoum
25	27–28 March 2007	Saudi Arabia	Riyadh
26	29–30 March 2008	Syria	Damascus
27	28–30 March 2009	Qatar	Doha
28	27–28 March 2010	Libya	Sirte
29	27–29 March 2012	Iraq	Baghdad
30	21–27 March 2013	Qatar	Doha
31	25–26 March 2014	Kuwait	Kuwait City
32	28–29 March 2015	Egypt	Sharm El Sheikh
33	20 July 2016	Mauritania	Nouakchott
34	23–29 March 2017	Jordan	Amman
35	15 April 2018	Saudi Arabia	Dhahran
36	31 March 2019	Tunisia	Tunis
37	1 November 2022	Algeria	Algiers
38	19 May 2023	Saudi Arabia	Jeddah
39	16 May 2024	Bahrain	Manama
40	17 May 2025	Iraq	Baghdad

=== Emergency summits ===
No.	Date	Host country	Host city
1	21–27 September 1970	United Arab Republic	Cairo
2	17–28 October 1976	Saudi Arabia	Riyadh
3	7–9 September 1985	Morocco	Casablanca
4	8–12 November 1987	Jordan	Amman
5	7–9 June 1988	Algeria	Algiers
6	23–26 June 1989	Morocco	Casablanca
7	28–30 May 1990	Iraq	Baghdad
8	9–10 August 1990	Egypt	Cairo
9	22–23 June 1996	Egypt	Cairo
10	21–22 October 2000	Egypt	Cairo
11	7 January 2016	Saudi Arabia	Riyadh
12	11 November 2023	Saudi Arabia	Riyadh
13	4 March 2025	Egypt	Cairo

- Two summits are not added to the system of Arab League summits:
  - Anshas, Egypt: 28–29 May 1946.
  - Beirut, Lebanon: 13 – 15 November 1958.
- Summit 12 in Fes, Morocco, occurred in two stages:
  - On 25 November 1981: the 5-hour meeting ended without an agreement on document.
  - On 6–9 September 1982.

== Military ==
The Joint Defence Council of the Arab League is one of the Institutions of the Arab League. It was established under the terms of the Joint Defence and Economic Co-operation Treaty of 1950 to coordinate the joint defence of the Arab League member states.

The Arab League as an organisation has no military force, similar to the UN, but at the 2007 summit, the leaders decided to reactivate their joint defence policy and establish a peacekeeping force to deploy in South Lebanon, Darfur, Iraq, and other hot spots.

At a 2015 summit in Egypt, member states agreed in principle to form a joint military force.

== Economic resources ==
The Arab League is rich in resources, such as enormous oil and natural gas resources in certain member states.

Economic achievements initiated by the League amongst member states have been less impressive than those achieved by smaller Arab organisations such as the Gulf Cooperation Council (GCC). Among them is the Arab Gas Pipeline, that will transport Egyptian and Iraqi gas to Jordan, Syria, Lebanon, and Turkey. As of 2013, a significant difference in economic conditions exist between the developed oil states of Algeria, Qatar, Kuwait and the UAE, and developing countries like the Comoros, Djibouti, Mauritania, Somalia, Sudan and Yemen.

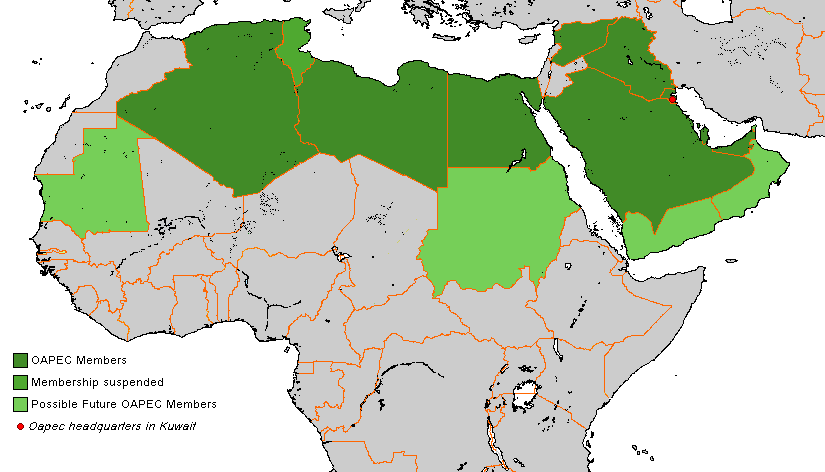
OAPEC Members

The Arab League also includes great fertile lands in the southern part of Sudan. It is referred to as the food basket of the Arab World, the region's instability including the independence of South Sudan has not affected its tourism industry, that is considered the fastest growing industry in the region, with Egypt, UAE, Lebanon, Tunisia, and Jordan leading the way. Another industry that is growing steadily in the Arab League is telecommunications.

Economical achievements within members have been low in the league's history, other smaller Arab Organizations have achieved more than the league has, such as the GCC, but lately several major economic projects that are promising are to be completed, the Arab Gas Pipeline is to end by 2010, Connecting Egyptian and Iraqi Gas to Jordan, Syria and Lebanon, and then to Turkey thus Europe, a free trade Agreement (GAFTA) is to be completed by 1 January 2008, making 95% of all Arab products tax free of customs.

=== Transport ===
The Arab League is divided into five parts when it comes to transport, with the Arabian Peninsula and the Near East being entirely connected by air, sea, roads and railways. Another part of the League is the Nile Valley, made up of Egypt and Sudan. These two member states have started to improve the River Nile's navigation system to improve accessibility and thus foster trading. A new railway system is also set to connect the southern Egyptian city of Abu Simbel with the northern Sudanese city of Wadi Halfa and then to Khartoum and Port Sudan. The third division of the League is the Maghreb, where a 3,000 km stretch of railway runs from the southern cities of Morocco to Tripoli in Western Libya. The fourth division of the League is the Horn of Africa, whose member states include Djibouti and Somalia. These two Arab League states are separated by only ten nautical miles from the Arabian Peninsula by the Bab el Mandeb and this is quickly changing as Tarik bin Laden, the brother of Osama bin Laden, has initiated the construction of the ambitious Bridge of the Horns project, which ultimately aims to connect the Horn of Africa with the Arabian Peninsula via a massive bridge. The project is intended to facilitate and accelerate the already centuries-old trade and commerce between the two regions. The last division of the League is the isolated archipelago of the Comoros located off the coast of East Africa, which is not physically connected to any other Arab state, but still trades with other Arab League members.

== Literacy ==
In collecting literacy data, many countries estimate the number of literate people based on self-reported data. Some use educational attainment data as a proxy, but measures of school attendance or grade completion may differ. Because definitions and data collection methods vary across countries, literacy estimates should be used with caution. United Nations Development Programme, Human Development Report 2010. The Persian Gulf region has had an oil boom, enabling more schools and universities to be set up.

Rank	Country	Literacy rate
1	Qatar	97.3
2	Palestine	96.5
3	Kuwait	96.3
4	Bahrain	95.7
5	Jordan	95.4
6	Saudi Arabia	94.4
7	Lebanon	93.9
8	United Arab Emirates	93.8
9	Oman	91.1
10	Libya	91
11	Syria	86.4
12	Iraq	85.7
13	Tunisia	81.8
14	Comoros	81.8
15	Algeria	80.2
16	Sudan	75.9
17	Egypt	73.8
18	Yemen	70.1
19	Djibouti	70.0
20	Morocco	68.5
21	Mauritania	52.1
22	Somalia	44–72

== Demographics ==
While Arabs constitute the vast majority of the Arab League, with Egyptians making up the largest specific population within this group, the region is also home to several other distinct ethnic groups. These include Berbers, Kurds, Somalis, Assyrians, Armenians, Nubians, Mandaeans, and Circassians. Each of these groups have their own distinct cultures, languages, and traditions. As of 1 July 2013, about 359 million people live in the states of the Arab League. Its population grows faster than in most other global regions. The most populous member state is Egypt, with a population of over 100 million. The least populated is the Comoros, with approximately 850,000 inhabitants.

Rank	Country	Population	Density (/km^{2})	Density (sq mi)	Notes
1	Egypt	109,450,000	109	282	2025
2	Sudan	50,418,000	27	70	2025
3	Algeria	47,251,000	20	52	2025
4	Iraq	45,521,000	102	264	2025
5	Yemen	41,774,000	79	205	2025
6	Morocco	37,712,000	86	223	2025
7	Saudi Arabia	36,006,000	17	44	2025
8	Syria	21,393,000	116	300	2010
9	Somalia	16,963,000	27	70	2025
10	Tunisia	12,432,000	76	197	2025
11	Jordan	11,442,000	128	332	2025
12	United Arab Emirates	11,083,000	133	344	2025
13	Libya	6,982,000	3.9	10.1	2025
14	Oman	5,502,000	17.8	46	2025
15	Palestine	5,477,000	910	2,357	2023
16	Lebanon	5,354,000	512	1,326	2024
17	Kuwait	5,112,000	287	743	2025
18	Mauritania	4,629,000	4.5	11.7	2025
19	Qatar	3,109,000	283	733	2025
20	Bahrain	1,657,000	2,209	5,721	2025
21	Djibouti	1,056,000	46	119	2025
22	Comoros	910,000	407	1,054	2025
Total	Arab League	481,233,000	36.5	94.5	2025

=== Religion ===
The majority of the Arab League's citizens adhere to Islam, with Christianity being the second largest religion. At least 15 million Christians combined live in Egypt, Iraq, Jordan, Lebanon, Palestine, Sudan and Syria. In addition, there are smaller but significant numbers of Druze, Yazidis, Shabaks and Mandaeans. Numbers for nonreligious Arabs are generally not available, but research by the Pew Forum suggests around 1% of people in the MENA region are "unaffiliated".

=== Languages ===
The official language of the Arab League is Literary Arabic, based on Classical Arabic. However, several Arab League member states have other co-official or national languages, such as Somali, Afar, Comorian, French, English, Berber and Kurdish. In most countries, there is a dominant non-codified spoken Arabic dialect.

== Culture ==
=== Sports ===
The Pan-Arab Games are considered the biggest Arab sporting event, which brings together athletes from all the Arab countries to participate in a variety of different sports.

The Union of Arab Football Associations organises the Arab Cup (for national teams) and the Arab Club Champions Cup (for clubs). Arab sport federations also exist for several games, include basketball, volleyball, handball, table tennis, tennis, squash and swimming.

== See also ==
- Arab Charter on Human Rights
- Arab Cold War
- Arab Fund for Economic and Social Development (AFESD)
- Arab leaders
- Arab League and the Arab–Israeli conflict
- Arab League boycott of Israel
- Arab Maghreb Union (UMA)
- Arab Monetary Fund
- Arab Organization for Industrialization
- Arab Parliament
- Arab Union
- Bloudan Conference of 1937
- Bloudan Conference of 1946
- Council of Arab Economic Unity (CAEU)
- Flag of the Arab League
- General Arab Insurance Federation
- General Union of Chambers of Commerce, Industry and Agriculture for Arab Countries
- Gulf Cooperation Council (GCC)
- Inshas
- International Association of Arabic Dialectology (AIDA)
- International Confederation of Arab Trade Unions
- List of conflicts in the Arab League
- List of country groupings
- List of largest cities in the Arab world
- List of multilateral free-trade agreements
- Lists of the Arab League
- Model Arab League
- Orange card system – motor insurance scheme of the Arab League
- Organisation of Islamic Cooperation
- Organization of Arab Petroleum Exporting Countries (OAPEC)
- Organization of the Petroleum Exporting Countries (OPEC)
- Pan Arab Games
- Pan-Arabism
- Summit of South American-Arab Countries
- United Arab Command
- Arab Standardization and Metrology Organization

== Notes ==
By ISO 639-3 code
Enter an ISO code to find the corresponding language article.
