= Geography of the Arab world =

- Continent: Asia and Africa
- Area
  - Total: 13,333,296 km^{2} (5,148,014 sq mi)
- Highest point: Jbel Toubkal; 4,165 m
- Lowest point: Lac Assal −155 m
- Longest river: Nile; 6,853 km

The Arab world comprises a large group of countries, mainly located in West Asia and North Africa. The Arab League, a regional organisation, consists of 22 countries located across Western Asia, Northern Africa, the Maghreb, the Horn of Africa, and the Indian Ocean, in 19 of which Arabs form a plurality, as well as Comoros, Djibouti and Somalia. It covers a combined area of 13 million km^{2}. It extends from Morocco in the west, southward to the Comoros, eastward to Somalia, and northward to Iraq.

== Geography of each country ==
The geography of each country. This list includes all 22 member states of The Arab League.

- Algeria
- Bahrain
- Comoros
- Djibouti
- Egypt
- Iraq
- Jordan
- Kuwait
- Lebanon
- Libya
- Mauritania
- Morocco
- Oman
- Palestine
- Qatar
- Saudi Arabia
- Somalia
- Sudan
- Syria
- Tunisia
- (United Arab Emirates) UAE
- Yemen

== Regions ==
Terrains in the area can be divided into three main types: the large arid desert covering most of it, the fertile south and north, and finally the high mountains of the Atlas, Ahaggar, Zagros and the Anti-Lebanon Mountains, along with the Hijaz Mountain range.

Geographically, the Arab world countries are further subdivided into four regions:

- Middle East
  - Bahrain
  - Iraq
  - Egypt
  - Jordan
  - Kuwait
  - Lebanon
  - Oman
  - Palestine
  - Qatar
  - Saudi Arabia
  - Syria
  - UAE
  - Yemen
- North Africa
  - Algeria
  - Libya
  - Mauritania
  - Morocco
  - Sudan
  - Tunisia
- Horn of Africa
  - Djibouti
  - Somalia
- Indian Ocean islands
  - Comoros

The Arab world has a high population density, with an estimated 350 million inhabitants. Culturally, the Arab states can be divided into 3 regions:

- The Greater Maghreb, which includes Morocco, Mauritania, Algeria, Tunisia and Libya.
- The Fertile Crescent, which includes Lebanon, Syria, Palestine, Egypt, Iraq and Jordan.
- The Arabian Peninsula, which includes Saudi Arabia, UAE, Qatar, Oman, Bahrain, Kuwait and Yemen.

== Landscape ==
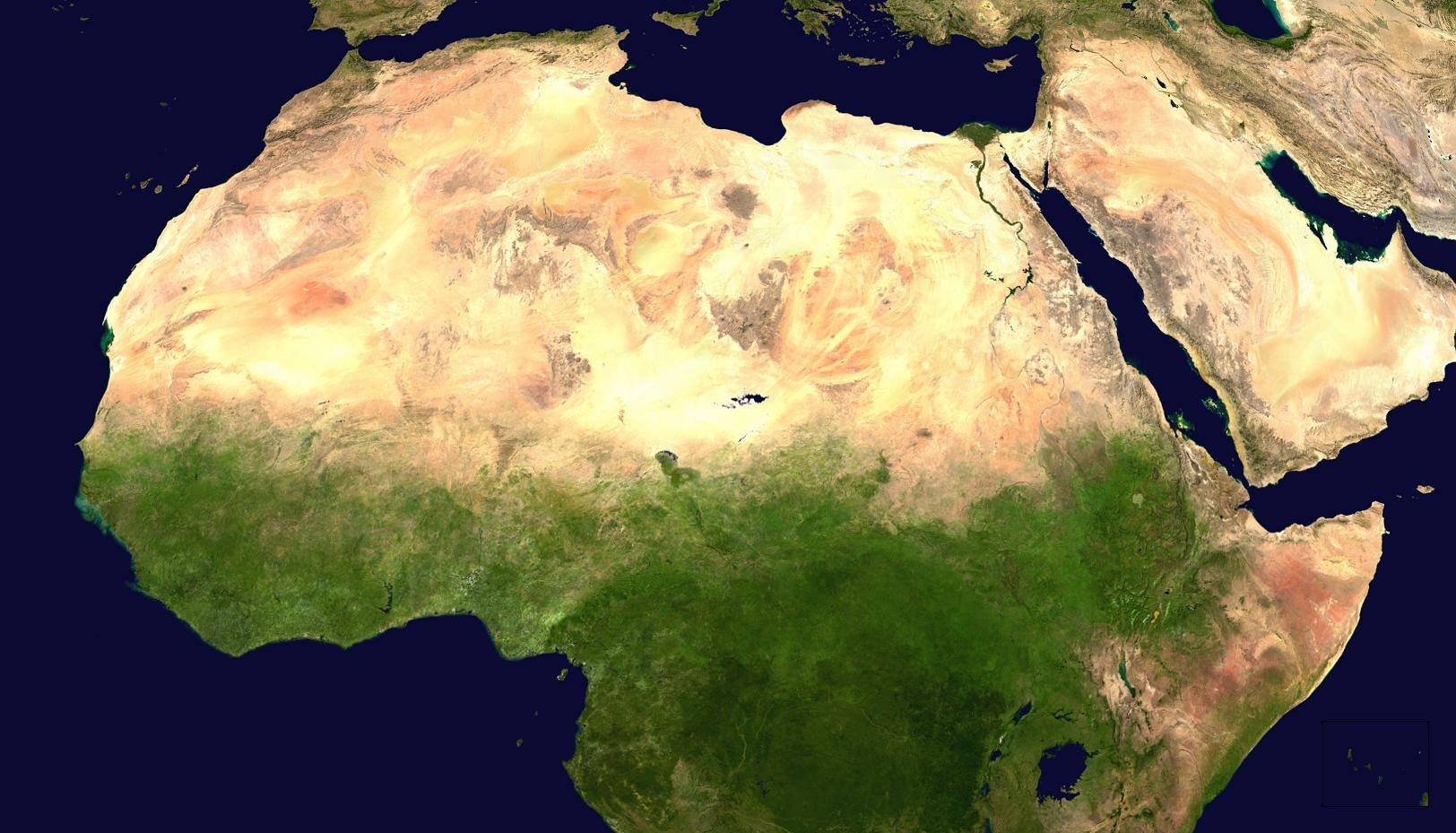
Aerial View of the Arab world

Most of the Arab world falls in the driest region of the world. Almost 80% of it is covered in desert (10,666,637 of 13,333,296 km2), stretching from Mauritania and Morocco to Oman and the UAE. The second most common terrain is the semi-arid terrain, which found in all Arab countries except Lebanon and Comoros.

Several deserts span the Arab world:

- Africa
- Sahara Desert
- Bayuda Desert
- Eastern Desert
- Western Desert
- Libyan Desert
- Danakil Desert
- Nubian Desert
- White Desert
- Eritrean coastal desert
- Asia
- Arabian Desert
- Ad-Dahna Desert
- Naqab Desert
- Nefud Desert
- Rub' al Khali Desert
- Syrian Desert
- Sinai Desert
- Tihamah Desert

The highest point in the Arab world is in Morocco called Jbel Toubkal, standing 4,165m tall, making it the 40th highest place on Earth, and 6th in Africa, next comes Jabal An-Nabi Shu'ayb (at 3,666 m (12,028 ft)) in Yemen and Cheekha Dar (at 3,611 m (11,847 ft)) in Iraq.

The lowest point in the Arab world is the Dead Sea between Jordan and Palestine. At 1,312 feet (400 meters) below sea level it is also the lowest point on Earth.

== Climate ==
The hottest temperature recorded in the Arab world took place in Kuwait from Mid-July to Mid-August 2022, reaching 54.6 °C (130.3 °F) in Kuwait City.

The coldest temperature recorded in the Arab world was recorded in Ifrane, Morocco falling as low as -23.9 °C (11 °F) on the 11th of Feb 1935.

== See also ==
- Geography of the Horn of Africa
- Geography of North Africa
- Geography of West Asia
