= Politics of the Arab League =

Politics of Arab regional organisation

The Arab League is a political organization aiming to help integrate its members economically, and solve in-between conflicts without asking for foreign aid. It possesses elements of a state representative parliament, while issues of foreign affairs are usually dealt under the United Nations supervision.

== Government ==
The Charter of the Arab League endorsed the principle of an Arab homeland while respecting the sovereignty of the individual member states.

The internal regulations of the Council of the League were agreed in October 1951 as well as those of the committees. Those of the Secretary-General were agreed in May 1953.

Since then, Arab order has based on this duality. Preservation of individual statehood derived its strengths from natural preferences of ruling elites to maintain their power and their independence in decision making. The fear of rich Arabs that poorer Arabs may come to share their wealth in the name of Arab nationalism, the feuds among Arab rulers and the influence of external powers that saw potential danger in Arab unity; all reinforced this duality.

== External Policies in UN negotiations ==
Party groupings. Arab group is purple in the middle.

In UN negotiations, the Arab League operates as the Arab Group in Negotiations of the UNFCCC as all 22 countries of the League are also parties to the UNFCCC. During negotiations they often take a common position on issues, and deliver joint statements and interventions.

== Inner Policies ==
=== Iraq ===
The Arab League supports a unified Iraqi state, with a united government.

=== Palestine ===
The Arab League has always supported the Palestinian side of the Palestinian-Israeli Conflict, as an organization it recognizes the Palestinian Authority as the legitimate Government of the State of Palestine. the Arab League has Addressed the International Community several Times, through the United Nations.

=== Syria ===
On December 19, 2011, the Syrian Ba'athist government agreed to allow observers from the Arab League to monitor Syria's progress in removing troops from protest areas, free political prisoners, and negotiate with dissidents. The mission was in accordance with the Arab League peace plan aimed to resolve the Syrian crisis. The monitors were dispatched and supported by the Arab League. On January 28, 2012, the Arab League announced an indefinite suspension of its mission, citing "a harsh new government crackdown made it too dangerous to proceed and was resulting in the deaths of innocent people across the country". Nabil al-Arabi, head of the Arab League, said that following discussions with Arab foreign ministers the league decided to suspend all monitoring activity in Syria.
