= List of conflicts in the Arab League =

For conflicts in the Arab League, see the following lists:

- List of modern conflicts in the Middle East
- List of modern conflicts in North Africa
- List of conflicts in Somalia
