= Model Arab League =

Competition that models the Arab League

- The logo of the Model Arab League, based on the original emblem of the Arab League
- Established: 1983; 43 years ago
- Purpose: Educational simulation of the Arab League
- Affiliations: The National Council on U.S.-Arab Relations (NCUSAR)
- Website: https://ncusar.org/modelarableague/

Model Arab League (also known as MAL) is an educational simulation in which students learn about diplomacy and international relations through debates in multi-regional model competitions, competing as representatives from the Member States of the Arab League. MAL was established in 1983 by The National Council on US - Arab Relations as a Youth Leadership Development Program.

Participants are encouraged to use the experience to hone their skills in public speaking, debating and diplomacy, in addition to the primary goal of the program which is to learn about the politics and history of the Arab world.

In the United States, the competitions are administered by The National Council on US - Arab Relations (NCUSAR). Outside the United States, the University of Peloponnese hosts the Corinth Model Arab League (CorMAL) and the American University in Cairo hosts the Cairo International Model Arab League (CIMAL).

== Structure ==
Model Arab League (MAL) is a debate simulation of the Arab League, a format similar to that of the Model United Nations (Model UN), which challenges students to accurately represent the needs and interests of United Nations (UN) member countries.

One of the biggest differences in structure between Model UN and MAL is that the latter is made up of only 22 member countries in contrast to Model UN's 193 member states. This difference in size allows for more focused and in-depth debating, but with a purview restricted to the history and politics of the Arab world.

Model Arab League is administered centrally from Washington, DC by The National Council on US - Arab Relations (NCUSAR), which works with local hosts to coordinate and run conferences across the United States. The National Council also updates debate topics and research guides yearly by utilizing nationally appointed student leaders who also act as secretariat for the National University Conference.

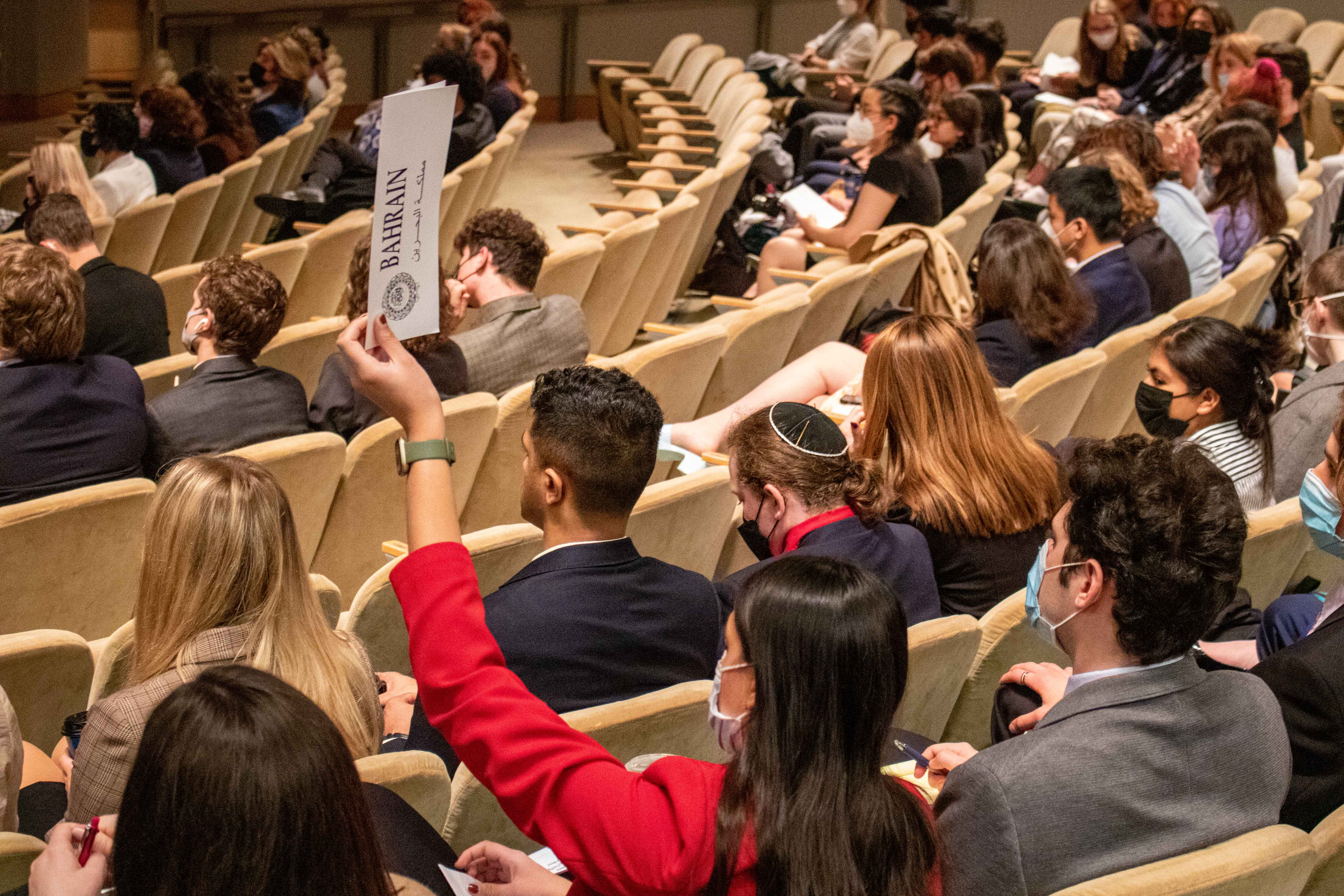
Participants in the conference of the 2022 National University Model Arab League

=== Conference Administration ===
MAL conferences are primarily run by regional coordinators, who are supported by a team of MAL students. The regional host is responsible for conducting outreach, recruiting new participants, scheduling conference space, and staffing the conference. Additional oversight is provided by a NCUSAR representative who travels to each conference to provide assistance in regards to interacting with students, ensuring standardization across conferences, and being the final say when enforcing parliamentary procedure.

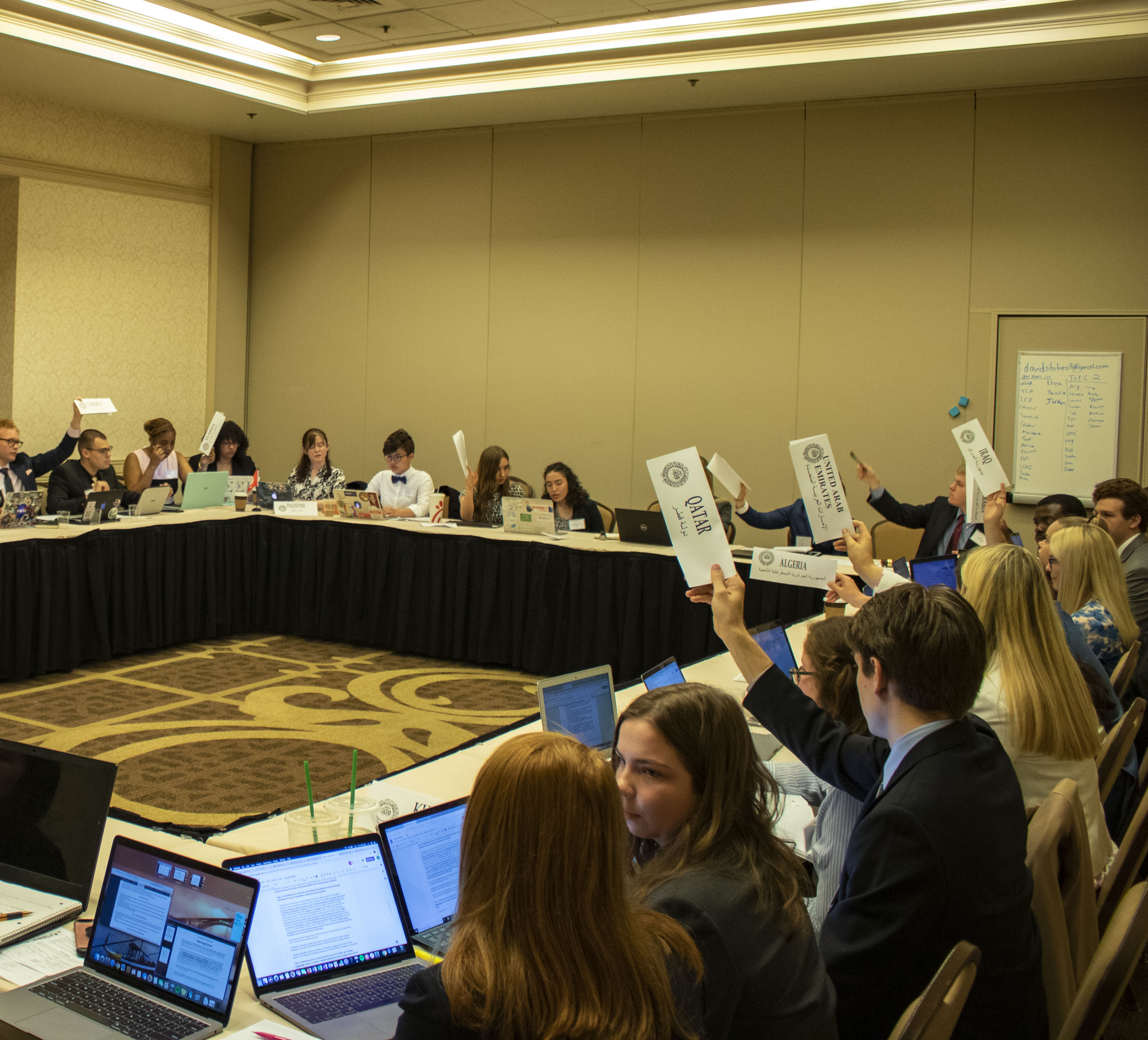
Students debate at a Model Arab League Conference

The rest of the conference is led by pre-selected student leaders divided into upper and lower secretariat, and headed by a Secretary General (SG), in similar fashion to the Secretary-General of the United Nations. The SG reviews draft resolutions created in council and checks for proper formatting and accurate policy simulation. SGs also enforce parliamentary procedure when necessary and are often supported by an Assistant Secretary General (ASG) and Chief of Staff (COS). The Upper Secretariat will include additional positions for larger conferences, such as ASG-2, and ASG of Information.

The Lower Secretariat consists of Council Chairman who moderate debate in each council. These positions are usually filled several months ahead of time at the discretion of the local host and the National Council representative. Chairs are supported by a Vice-Chair, Rapporteur, and Parliamentarian, all of whom are voted on by members of each council. Vice-Chairs support the Chair in reviewing resolutions, and will often chair for short periods to gain additional experience. Vice-Chairs regularly become full Council Chairs at the next regional conference. Lastly, Rapporteurs maintain lists of countries wishing to be heard in debate, while Parliamentarians may be called on at any time to clarify parliamentary procedure.

== Conferences ==
Model Arab League Conferences fall into three categories: College, High School and International. In the United States, the college competitions consist of a series of regional conferences and as well as several national conferences held in Washington, DC.

=== List of Conferences ===
The College regional and national conferences include (as of 2020):

- Appalachia Regional
- Bilateral Chamber (Houston) Regional
- Capital Area Regional
- Florida Regional
- Great Plains Regional
- Michigan Regional
- National University Conference
- Northeast Regional
- Northern California Regional
- Northern Rockies Regional
- Ohio Valley Regional
- Rocky Mountain Regional
- Southeast Regional
- Southern California Regional
- Southwest Regional
- Upper Midwest Regional

The Southeast and the Northeast conferences are both the oldest and largest regional conferences and draw in several hundred participants every year.

== Councils and Topics ==
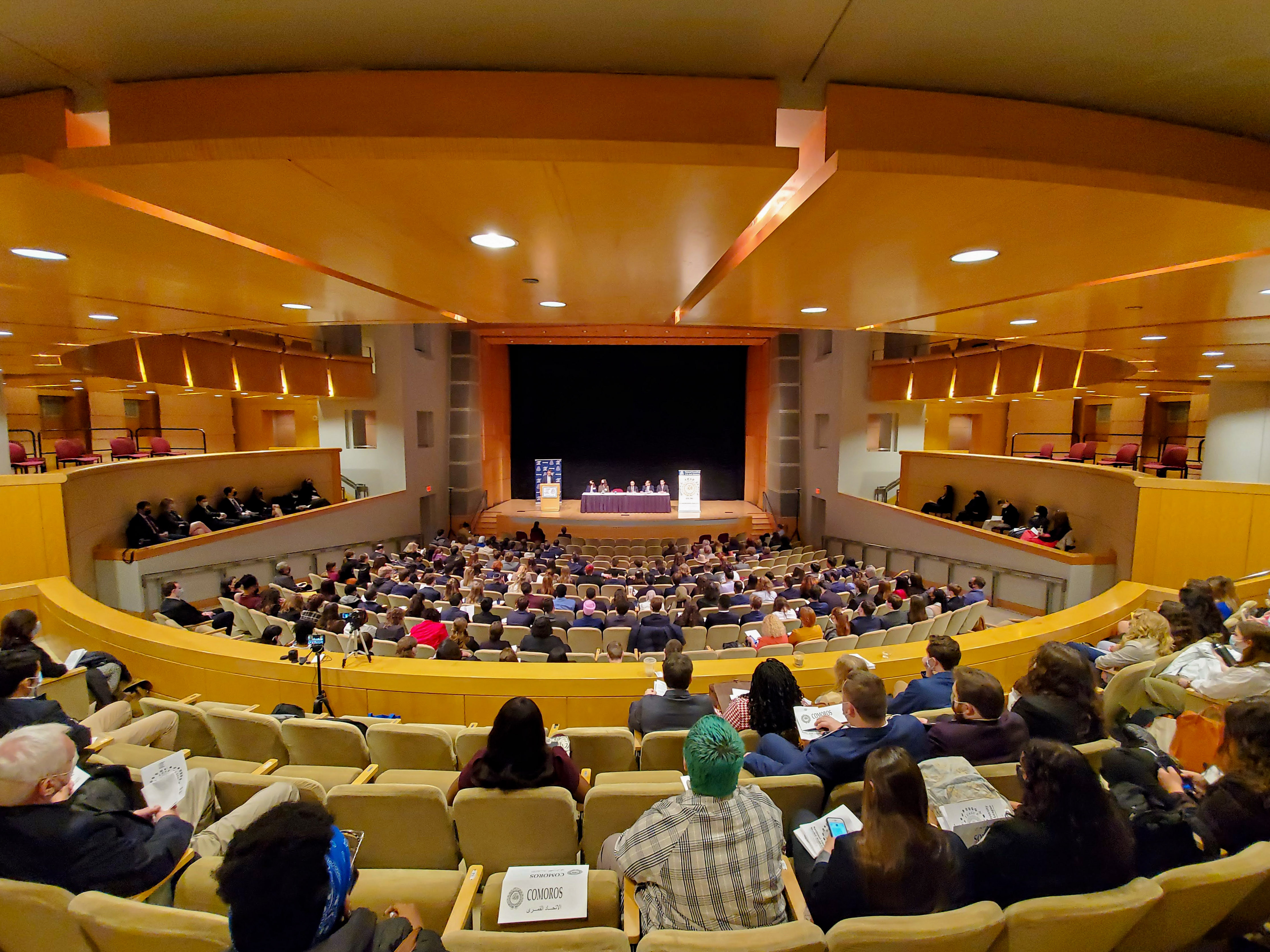
Students at the 2022 National University Model Arab League conference

Model Arab League conferences are divided into councils that each focus on a specific area of Arab League policy. Although the councils offered by international conferences such as the Cairo International MAL tend to fluctuate, The National Council on US - Arab Relations (NCUSAR) assures that most simulations within the U.S. share common councils and structure from year to year.

=== The Councils ===
The NCUSAR-sponsored council list consists of eight councils, though not all of the councils are simulated at all models.

==== Joint Defense Council (JDC) ====
The Joint Defense Council primarily deals with matters of collective security within the Arab League. The JDC operates under the guidelines of the Treaty of Joint Defense and Economic Cooperation Between the States of the Arab League, June 17, 1950.

==== Council on Palestinian Affairs ====
The Council on Palestinian Affairs is charged with evaluating and responding to the plethora of issues involving the Palestinian people and their interaction with their neighbors. As Palestine is a fully recognized Member State of the Arab League, the representative from Palestine has considerable influence in this council.

==== Council of Arab Social Affairs Ministers ====
This council deals primarily with social matters relating to the Arab world, such as human rights, refugees, etc.

==== Council on Political Affairs ====
The Council on Political Affairs focuses on matters related to political interactions between Member States of the Arab League and between the Arab League or certain Member States and states outside of the Arab League.

==== Council of Arab Environmental Affairs Ministers ====
This council is concerned with environmental conditions within and related to Member States of the Arab League. Issues such as water rights, agricultural chemicals, and long-term environmental sustainability are often discussed in this council.

==== Council of Arab Economics Affairs Ministers ====
The Council of Arab Economics Affairs Ministers focuses its efforts on ensuring the economic success of the Arab world. This council has historically focused on topics such as long-term economic stability, diversification away from primarily oil-based economies, and ensuring adequate employment opportunities for persons living in the Arab world.

==== Special Summit of Arab Heads of State ====
The Special Summit was available in certain regional competitions, as well as the national competition in Washington, D.C., for the 2008 competition. This simulation is unique from the others in that instead of simply role-playing a diplomat from a Member State, individuals working in this Special Summit are actually asked to role-play a Head of state of a specific Arab League Member State. This leads to a unique experience for everyone involved in the Special Summit as they are the final authority on all policy matters for their respective state, and therefore must be careful of their announced decisions and negotiations in this body as they may impact all of the delegates from the same Member State assigned to the other councils.

==== Special Council ====
Special Council is not restricted to any one theme, and rotates every year to a new area of concern not covered by other councils. Previous Special Councils have addressed violence against women and children, post conflict recovery, and religion and extremism.

The Special Council for the 2021-2022 MAL season deals with issues related to Technology and Cyber-security in the MENA region.

==== Arab Court of Justice (ACJ) ====
The Arab Court of Justice is an idealized body that does not actually have a counterpart in the Arab League. The ACJ is simulated at Model Arab League conferences in order to demonstrate the potential effectiveness of such an entity to the Arab League. The ACJ typically deals with controversial matters within the Arab world and attempts to provide solutions for these problems. Court cases have historically ranged from refugee and employment disputes to questions of resource allocation and territorial disputes, particularly with regard to Western Sahara. Much of how the ACJ functions is modeled after the International Court of Justice.

== Member States ==
Initially, in 1945, there were only six members. Today, the Arab League has 22 members, including three African countries among the largest by area (Sudan, Algeria and Libya) and the largest country in Western Asia (Saudi Arabia).

There was a continual increase in membership during the second half of the 20th century. As of 2023, there are 22 member states:

- Algeria
- Bahrain
- Comoros
- Djibouti
- Egypt
- Iraq
- Jordan
- Kuwait
- Lebanon
- Libya
- Mauritania
- Morocco
- Oman
- Palestine
- Qatar
- Saudi Arabia
- Somalia
- Sudan
- Syria
- Tunisia
- United Arab Emirates
- Yemen

and 5 observer states (note: the below observer states have been invited to participate during select Arab League sessions, but do not hold voting privileges):

- Armenia
- Brazil
- Eritrea
- India
- Venezuela

=== Suspensions ===
Egypt was suspended from the Arab League on 26 March 1979 due to the Egypt–Israel peace treaty. In 1987, Arab League states restored diplomatic relations with Egypt, the country was readmitted to the League in May 1989 and the League's headquarters were moved back to Cairo in September 1990.

Libya was suspended on 22 February 2011, following the outbreak of the First Libyan Civil War. The Arab League voted to restore Libya's membership on 27 August 2011 by accrediting a representative of the National Transitional Council, which was the partially recognised interim government of the country.

Syria was suspended on 16 November 2011 in the aftermath of the outbreak of the Syrian Civil War. On 6 March 2013, the Arab League gave the Syrian National Coalition Syria's seat in the Arab League. On 9 March 2014, secretary general Nabil Elaraby stated that Syria's seat would remain vacant until the opposition completes the formation of its institutions. In 2021, the Arab League initiated a process of normalisation between Syria and other Arab nations. On 7 May 2023, at the meeting of the Council of the Arab League in Cairo, it was agreed to reinstate Syria's membership.

== See also ==
- Arab League
- Model Congress
- Model United Nations
- Model European Parliament
- Model European Union Strasbourg
- National Council on US - Arab Relations
