= Arabic history =

Arabic history may refer to:

- Arab history, the history of the Arabic peoples
- History of Arabic, the history of the Arabic language
- History of Arabia, the history of the Arabian Peninsula
