= History of the Arabs =

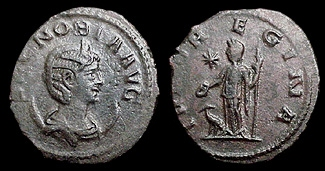
Queen Zenobia, c. 240 – c. 274 CE) was a third-century queen of the Palmyrene Empire in Syria. One of several ancient female rulers in antiquity of Arab origin. Depicted as empress on the obverse of an antoninianus (272 CE).

The history of the Arabs is recorded to have begun in the mid-9th century BCE, corresponding with the earliest known attestation of Old Arabic. Arab ancestry according to tradition in Islam holds that Arabs are the descendants of Ishmael, who was the son of the Hebrew patriarch Abraham and his Egyptian concubine Hagar. The Syrian Desert, which includes an extension of the Arabian Peninsula, is the home of the first attested "Arab" groups, as well as other defined Arab groups that spread in the land and existed for millennia.

Before the expansion of the Rashidun Caliphate (632–661) during the early Muslim conquests, the word "Arab" referred to any of the largely nomadic or settled Arab tribes in the Arabian Peninsula, the Levant, and Upper and Lower Mesopotamia. Today, "Arab" refers to a variety of large numbers of people whose native regions form the Arab world due to Arab migrations and the concurrent spread of the Arabic language throughout the region, namely the Levant and the Maghreb, following the rise of Islam in the 7th century. During this period, they forged the Rashidun Caliphate (632–661), the Umayyad Caliphate (661–750), and the Abbasid Caliphate (750–1258). These Arab dynasties ruled some of the largest land empires in history, reaching southern France in the west, China in the east, Anatolia in the north, and Sudan in the south. In 1517, the Mamluk Sultanate of Cairo was conquered by the Ottoman Empire, which went on to rule much of the Arab world until World War I, after which it was defeated and dissolved and its territories partitioned, forming the modern Arab states. Following the adoption of the Alexandria Protocol in 1944, the Arab League was founded on 22 March 1945. The Charter of the Arab League endorsed the principle of an Arab homeland while respecting the individual sovereignty of its member states.

== Antiquity ==
=== Prehistoric Arabia ===
In the Neolithic period of Prehistoric Arabia, local Neolithic communities — many of them pastoralist, semi-sedentary, and seasonally mobile — engaged in herding, agriculture, and sometimes fishing in the Syrian steppe from at least 6000 BCE. By about 850 BCE, a complex network of settlements and camps was established. The earliest Arab tribes emerged from Bedouin groups.

=== Iron age ===
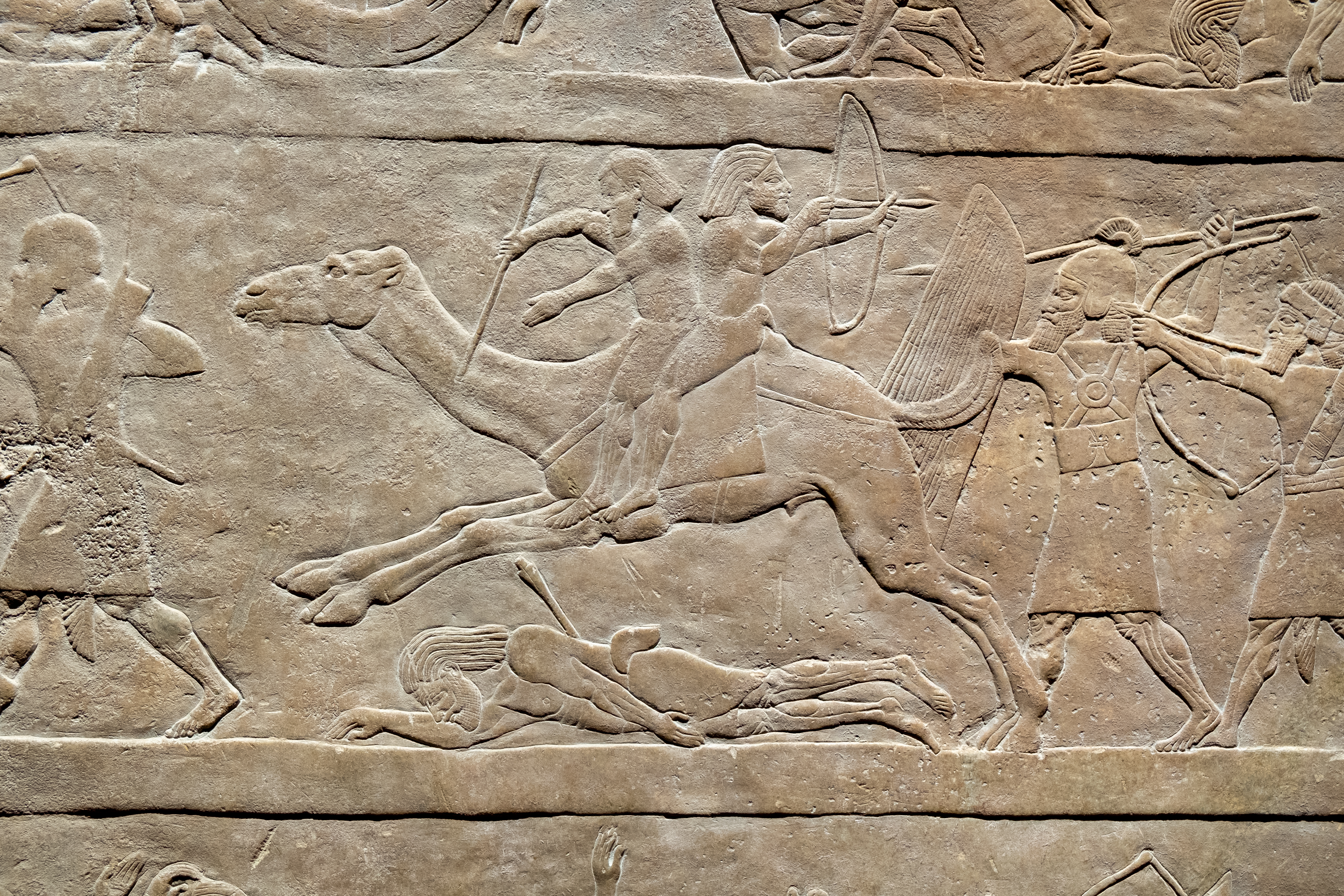
Relief from Ashurbanipal's palace showing Assyrians fighting and pursuing Arabs on camelback.

Arabs are first mentioned in Biblical and Assyrian texts of the 9th to 5th centuries BC where they inhabited parts of the Levant, Mesopotamia and Arabia. Several Arab tribes and towns are identified during the Neo-Assyrian period through their onomastics and toponyms. These tribes were present throughout Mesopotamia and the Syrian Desert, and in many times their presence often accompanied Aramean tribes. In the land of Laqē near Terqa, which was mentioned in an inscription by Adad-nirari II (911–891 BC), Aramaean and Arab clans formed a confederacy.

When Shalmaneser III descended on Pattin in 858 BC, he fought a force which included two Arab chieftains from transhumant tribes of the lower Orontes valley: a certain Bur-'Anat of Yašbuq, and Hada[d-ya]ṯa of a tribe whose name is lost. In the Battle of Qarqar in 853 BC, Arabs were part of a Damascene coalition of Syrian and Israelite allies under Gindibu, who ruled over an Arab kingdom located in the northeastern parts of present-day Jordan and Wadi Sirhan. In the reign of Tiglath-Pileser III (744–727 BC), the "Arabāy" (Arabs) were among the Syrians integrated into the Assyrian administrative system, and were reportedly located in the regions of Damascus, Tadmor and Homs. Tiglath-Pileser III even appointed a certain Arab, Idibi'ilu, to the Sinai peninsula jurisdiction. Arab raiders were also active in the Beqaa Valley, where they attacked Sargon II's (722–705 BC) troops.

A reference to the potential ancestors of Nabataeans, the Nabayatu, is made in a Babylonian letter from before 648 BC. The Nabaytau reportedly lived in the Babylonian border region, and were probably the namesake of the city of Nabatu mentioned in an inscription of Marduk-apla-iddina II (721–710 BC). During the campaigns of Ashurbanipal (669–631 BC) most Nabayatu clans shifted to the Syrian Desert, and by the 6th century had migrated to the area south of Wadi Sirhan. Ashurbanipal launched a punitive campaign against the Arabs in Hauran from his base in Damascus, capturing Abiyate the Qedarite and taking him to Assyria.

=== Classical kingdoms ===
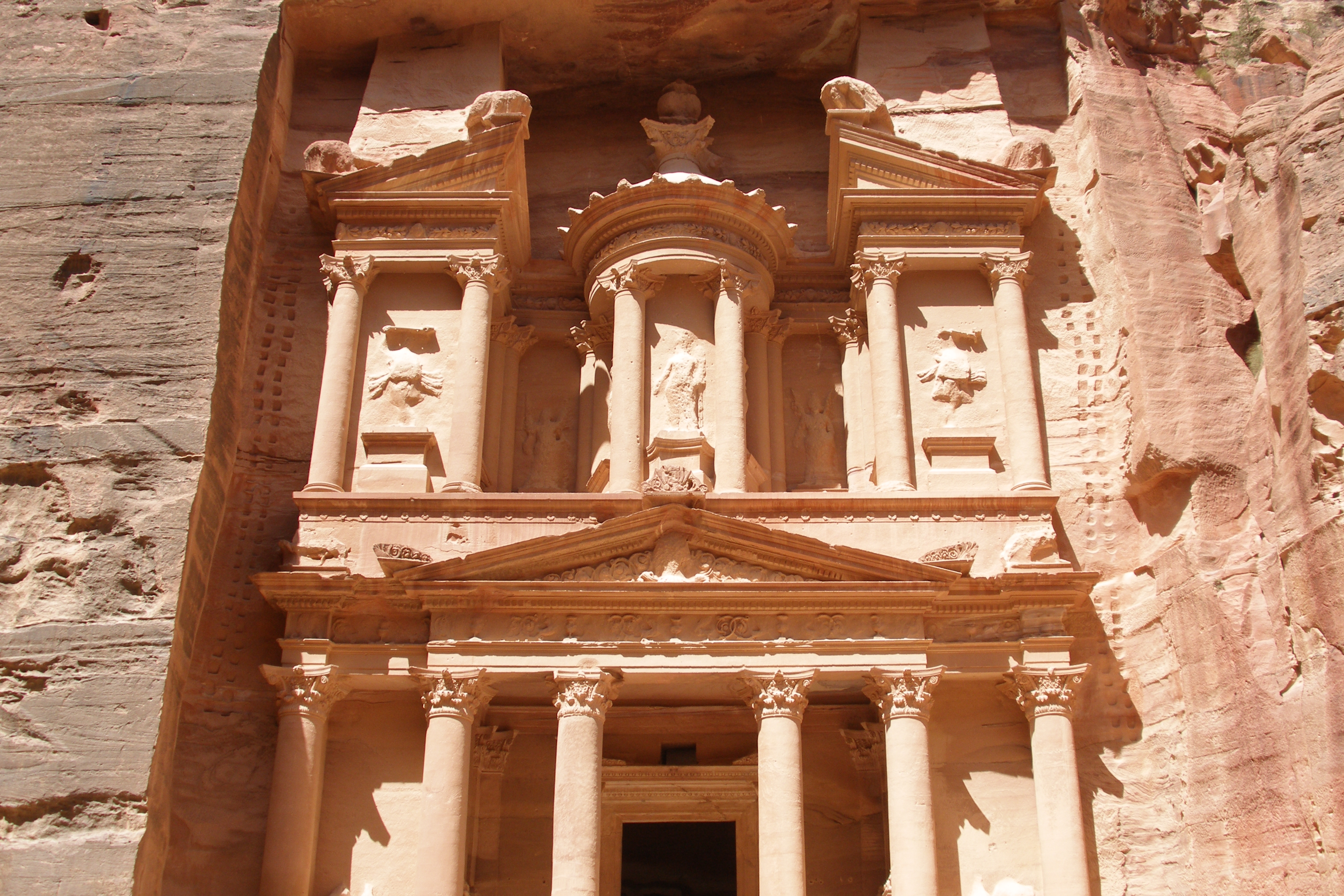
Façade of Al Khazneh in Petra, Jordan, built by the Nabateans.

Ancient North Arabian texts give a clearer picture of Arabic's developmental history and emergence. Ancient North Arabian is a collection of texts from Jordan, Saudi Arabia and Syria which not only recorded ancient forms of Arabic, such as Safaitic and Hismaic, but also of pre-Arabic languages previously spoken in the Arabian peninsula, such as Dadanitic, Hasaitic and Taymanitic. The texts are either written in variants or closely related sister scripts of epigraphic south Arabian musnad.

==== Nabataeans ====
The Nabataeans were nomads who moved into territory vacated by the Edomites – Semitic-speakers who settled the region centuries before them. Their early inscriptions were in Aramaic but gradually switched to their spoken Nabataean Arabic, thus producing some of the earliest clear Arabic texts. The Nabataean alphabet was adopted by Arabs to the south, and evolved into modern Arabic script around the 4th century. This is attested by Safaitic inscriptions (beginning in the 1st century BC) and the many Arabic personal names in Nabataean inscriptions. From about the 2nd century BC, a few inscriptions from Qaryat al-Faw reveal a dialect no longer considered proto-Arabic, but pre-classical Arabic. Five Syriac inscriptions mentioning Arabs have been found at Sumatar Harabesi northeast of Harran, one of which dates to the 2nd century AD.

==== In Syria ====
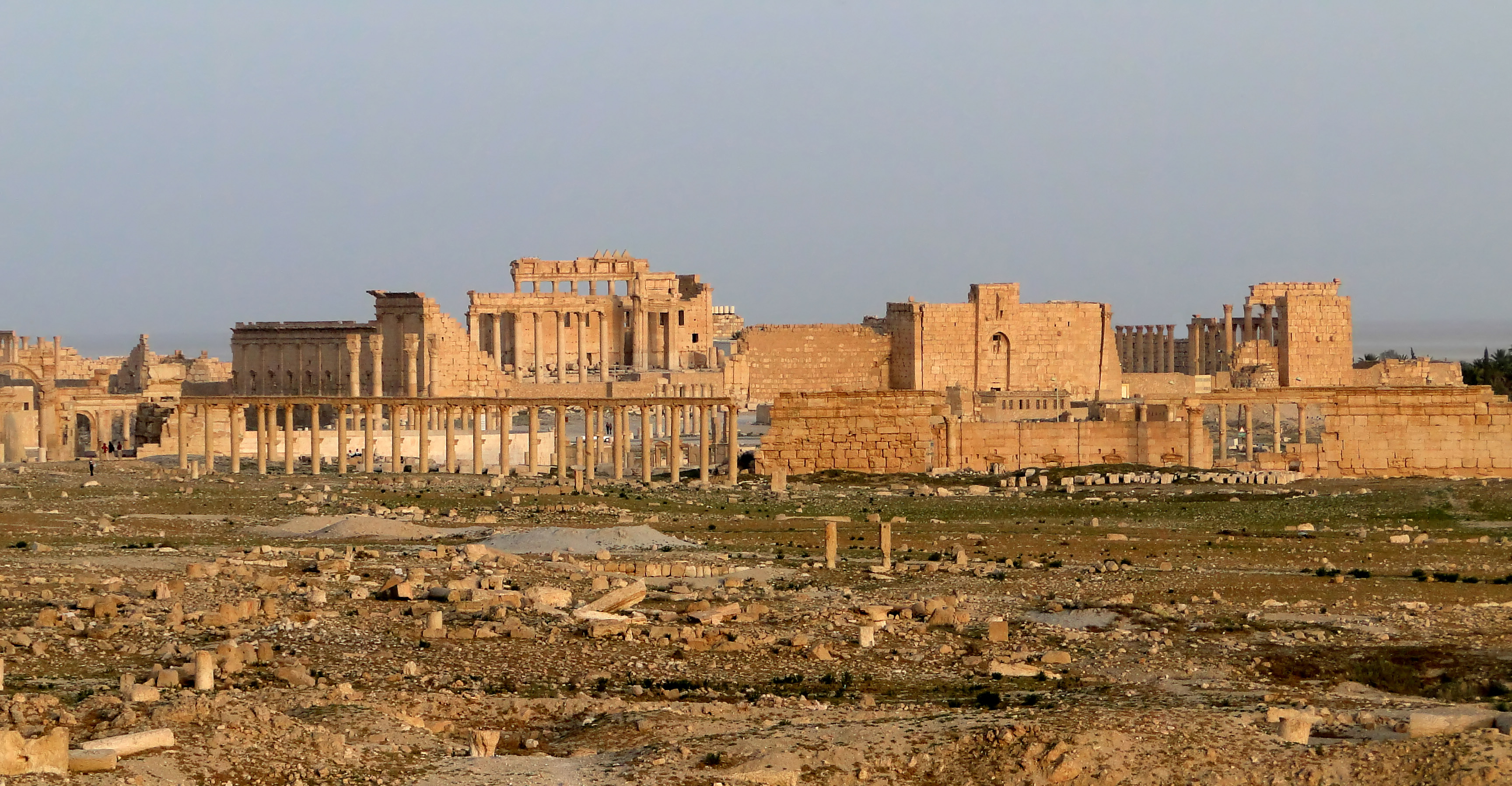
The ruins of Palmyra. The Palmyrenes were an admixture of Arabs, Amorites and Arameans.

Arabs are first recorded in Palmyra in the late first millennium BC. The soldiers of the sheikh Zabdibel, who aided the Seleucids in the battle of Raphia (217 BC), were described as Arabs; Zabdibel and his men were not actually identified as Palmyrenes in the texts, but the name "Zabdibel" is a Palmyrene name leading to the conclusion that the sheikh hailed from Palmyra. After the Battle of Edessa in 260 CE, the Roman emperor Valerian was taken prisoner. Assuming the side of Rome, the Palmyrenes united under Odaenathus and defeated the Sassanian armies in several battles, even reaching the capital city, Ctesiphon, twice.

Odaenathus' son Vaballathus succeeded him in 270 under the regency of his mother Zenobia, who declared the Palmyrene Empire, quickly capturing most of the Near East, including Egypt and most of Asia Minor in 271, reaching Ancyra. Zenobia was defeated by Aurelian with the help of the Arab enemies of Zenobia, the Tanukhids. The Tanukhids initially appear in 196 CE as a federation of Arab tribes roaming the western banks of the Euphrates who later made way into central and northern Syria, where they became part of the foederati of the Romans. They rebelled against Roman authority in 378 CE under their queen, Mavia, who led her forces into Palestine, Arabia and even the edges of Egypt, and also served as auxiliaries in the Roman army.

South of the Taurus range and in the region of Antioch were an Arab group ruled by a certain Aziz, who played an important role in the affairs of the last Seleucid king Antiochus XIII Asiaticus. To the east of Antioch was another Arab group that ruled in Chalcidice represented by the Rhambaei, Gambarus and Themella, who were ruled by way of various Arab princes, including a famous Alchaedamnus who fought against Tigranes and in Caesar's civil war. Another Arab group or community was established in the Orontes river valley, the Emesene Arabs who dominated Emesa and Aresutha until the 2nd century, and were involved in the affairs of late Seleucid monarchs under their chief Sempsigeramus. In al-Zabadani region close by the Qalamoun Mountains, was an Arab group known as the Zabadaioi who came into conflict with Alexander Jannaeus (103–76 BCE).

The Itureans, another Arab group known since Alexander the Great, inhabited the Bekaa valley, Southern Lebanon and the Anti-Lebanon mountains, and from there they expanded their territories into the Phoenician coast, Aurinitis, Trachonitis and Batanaea, coming close to Damascus. In southern Palestine, the Idumaeans inhabited and became numerous in the area west of the Dead Sea, whose names comprised an admixture of Arabic and Canaanite names.

Arabs were also living in Egypt even in pre-Christian times, in the Ptolemaic nome called Arabia, in Arsinoites across the Nile, and in Thebaid.

==== In Mesopotamia ====
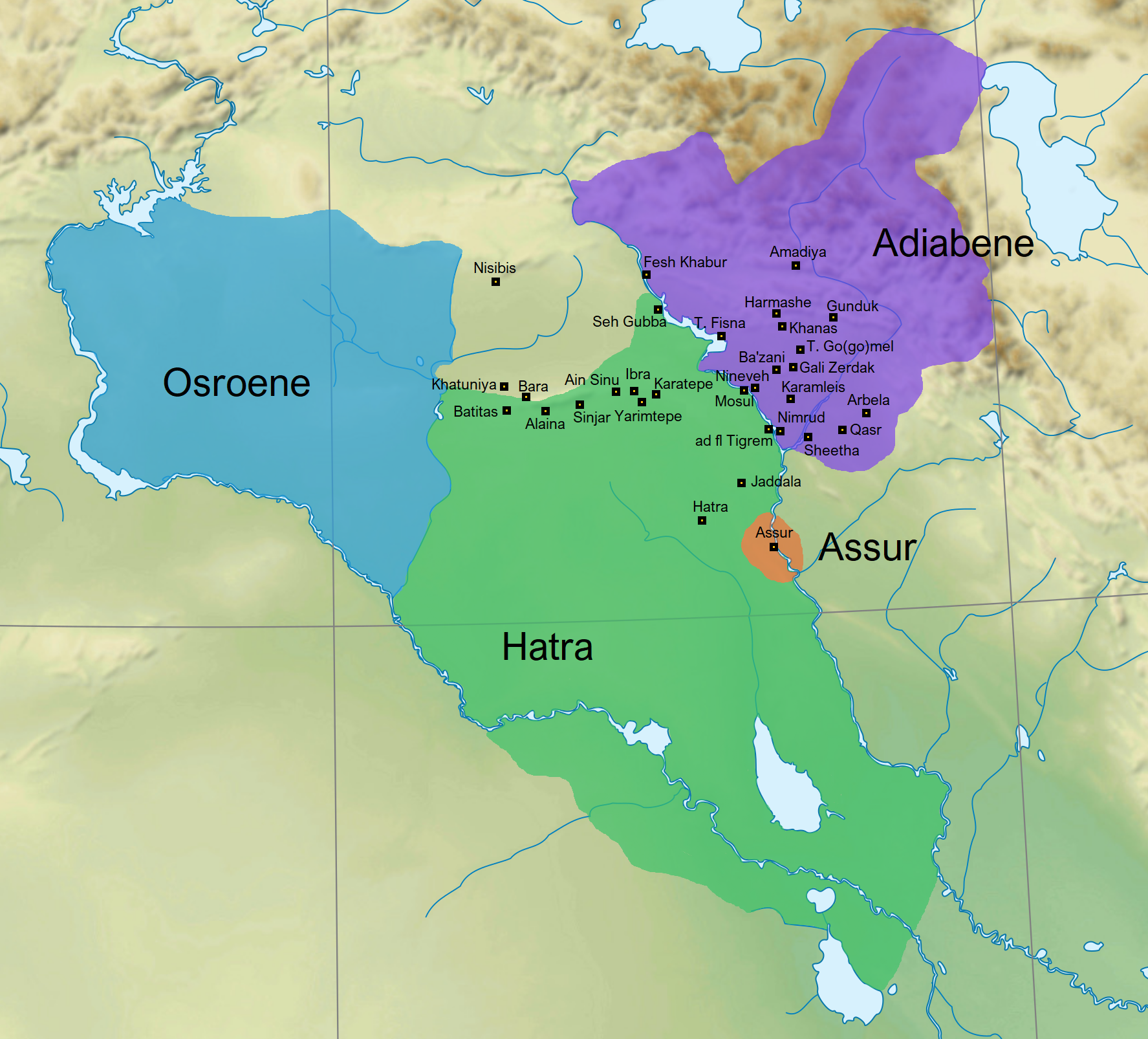
Approximate map of the kingdoms of Hatra, Edessa and Adiabene as vassals of the Parthians in Mesopotamia in 200 CE

Further north, the Osroeni Arabs were in possession of the city of Edessa which they had occupied and ruled since the 2nd century BC, and which they had continued to rule until the 3rd century CE. The Kingdom of Hatra was similarly ruled by an Arab dynasty since the 2nd century CE, whose rulers assumed the title malka often in form of "King of the Arabs". The Osroeni and Hatrans were part of several Arab groups or communities in upper Mesopotamia, who also included the Praetavi of Singara (present-day Sinjar, Iraq) reported by Pliny the Elder, and the Arabs of Adiabene. This elaborate Arab presence in upper Mesopotamia was acknowledged by the Sasanians, who called the region Arbayistan, meaning "land of the Arabs".

=== Late kingdoms ===
Tanukhid territories in the Levant, Mesopotamia and Arabia in the 4th century

A map published by the British academic Harold Dixon during World War I, showing the presence of the Arab tribes in West Asia, 1914

Several Arab entities flourished during middle and late Antiquity; these included kingdoms and confederations of tribes that dominated large swaths of land in the Arabian Peninsula, Levant and Mesopotamia.

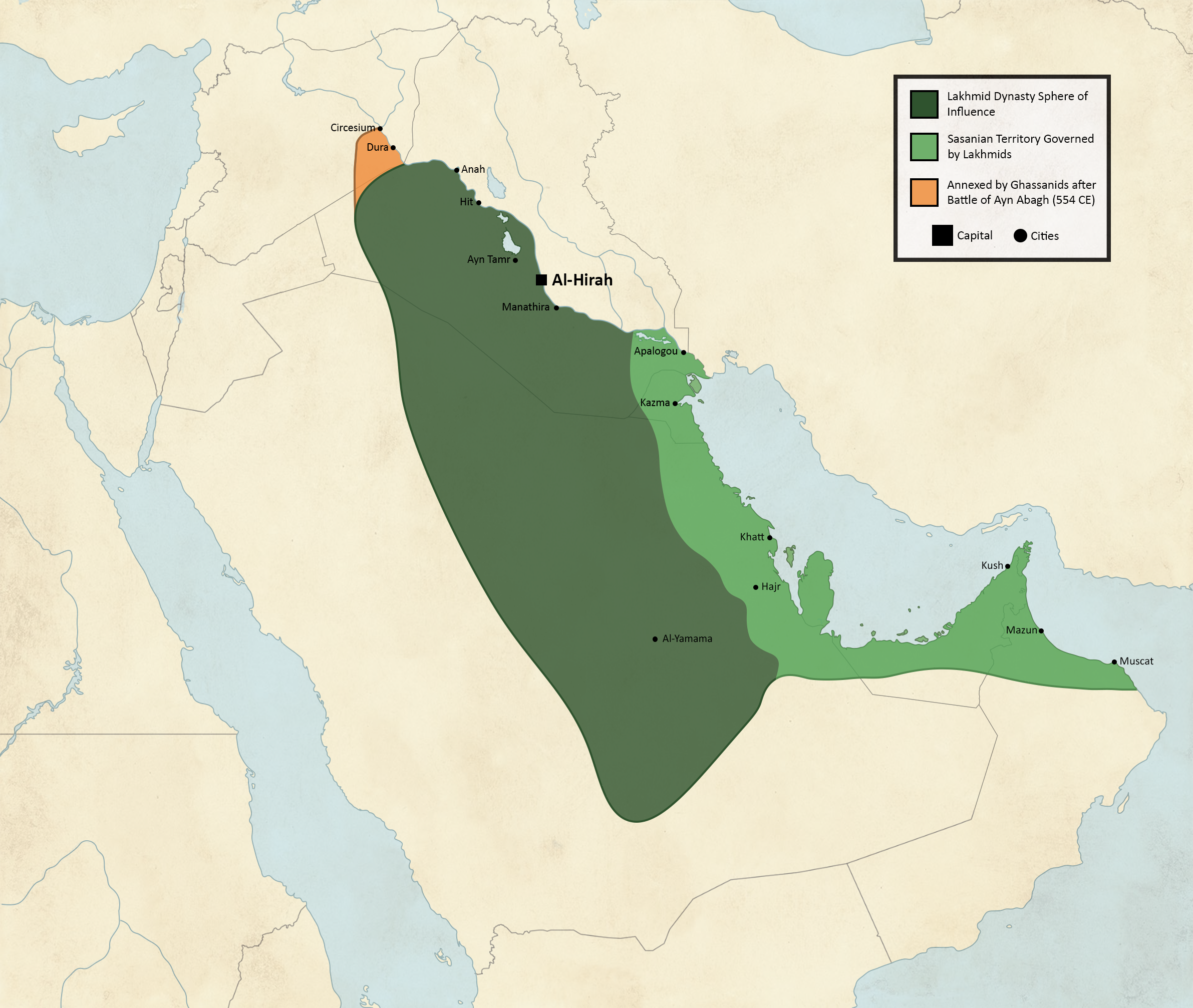
Map of the Lakhmid Kingdom in the 6th-century at its peak. Light green is Sasanian territory governed by the Lakhmids.

In central Arabia and Iraq, the Lakhmids assumed leadership from the Tanukhids and established themselves as clients for the Sasanians by 300 CE, ruling from their capital city of Al-Hirah and acting as a buffer between them and the Romans and unruly nomadic Arab tribes further south. Their Ghassanid counterparts served the same purpose for the Byzantines after their settlement in Syria likely between 250 and 300 CE. The Ghassanids were part of an influx from Yemen due to conflict between the South Arabian kingdoms of Qataban, Himyar and Sabaa in the 2nd and 3rd centuries CE; it's not clear whether or not Ghassanids originally spoke Arabic or a South Semitic language like the ones spoken in Yemen at the time. Upon their settlement in the Levant around 300 CE, the Ghassanids also became part of the foederati, along with several other Arab tribes in the region including Banu Amilah and Banu Judham.

Ghassanid kingdom in the 6th century

Greeks and Romans referred to all the nomadic population of the desert in the Near East as Arabi. The Romans called Yemen "Arabia Felix". The Romans called the vassal nomadic states within the Roman Empire Arabia Petraea, after the city of Petra, and called unconquered deserts bordering the empire to the south and east Arabia Magna.

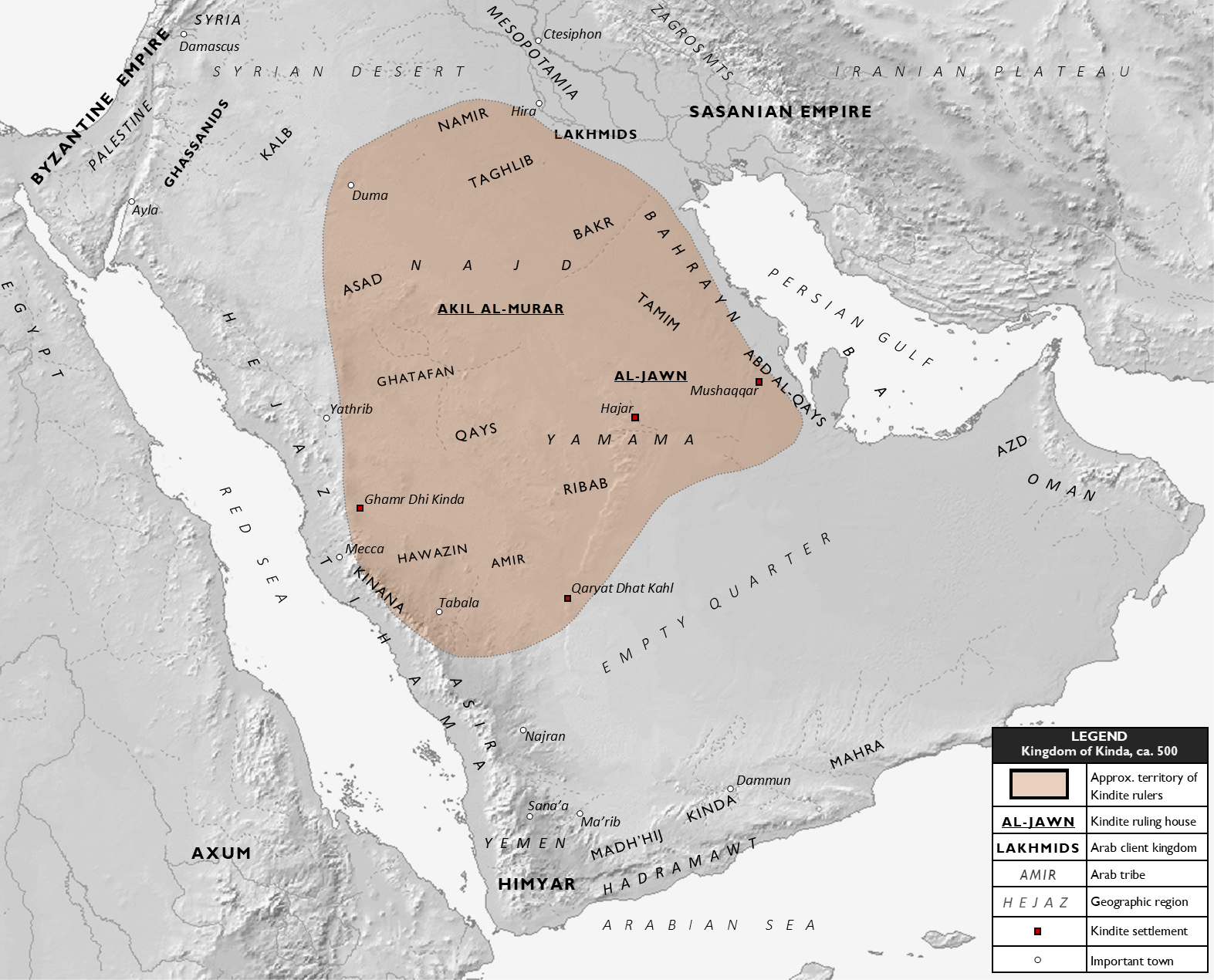
Approximate extent of the Kingdom of Kinda, c. 500

The Kingdom of Kinda was yet another Arab entity in central Arabia, established in 450 CE as a confederation of the Ma'ad tribes ruled by the Kindites. The Kindites originally migrated from Yemen along with the Ghassanids, where they had served as nomad auxiliaries for the armies of the Sabaean and Himyarite kings, but were turned back in Eastern Arabia by the Abdul Qais Rabi'a tribe. They returned to Yemen and allied themselves with the Himyarites who installed them as a vassal kingdom that ruled Central Arabia from "Qaryah Dhat Kahl" (the present-day called Qaryat al-Faw). The Lakhmids contested control of the Central Arabian tribes with the Kindites with the Lakhmids eventually destroying Kinda in 540 after the fall of their main ally Himyar. The Persian Sassanids dissolved the Lakhmid dynasty in 602, being under puppet kings, then under their direct control. They ruled much of the Northern/Central Arabian peninsula, until they were destroyed by the Lakhmid king Al-Mundhir, and his son 'Amr.

== Medieval period ==
Age of the Caliphs Expansion under Muhammad, 622–632/A.H. 1–11 Expansion during the Rashidun Caliphate, 632–661/A.H. 11–40 Expansion during the Umayyad Caliphate, 661–750/A.H. 40–129

=== Rashidun Caliphate (632–661) ===
United by their new faith after the death of Muhammad in 632, the Rashidun armies launched campaigns of conquest of the surrounding territories controlled by the Sassanians and Romans, effectually establishing what is known in Islamic chronology as the Rashidun Caliphate. The state was centered at the Hejaz, in particular in Medina from 632 until 656 CE, when Ali moved the capital to Kufa.

=== Umayyad Caliphate (661–750) ===
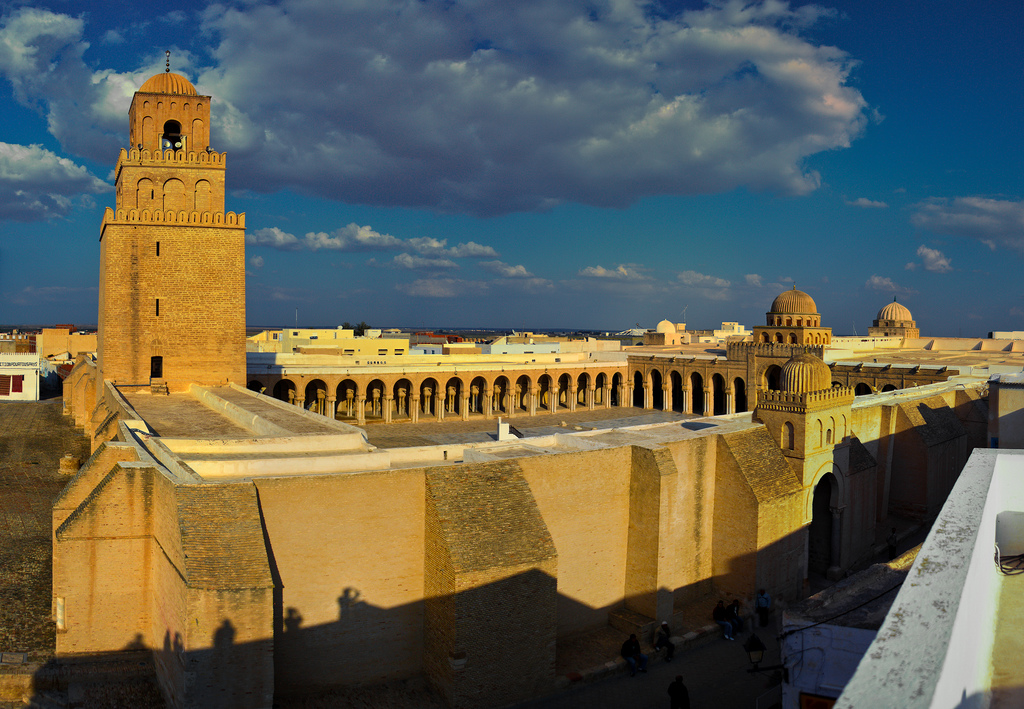
The Great Mosque of Kairouan in Kairouan, Tunisia was founded in 670 by the Arab general Uqba ibn Nafi; it is the oldest mosque in the Maghreb and represents an architectural testimony of the Arab conquest of North Africa.

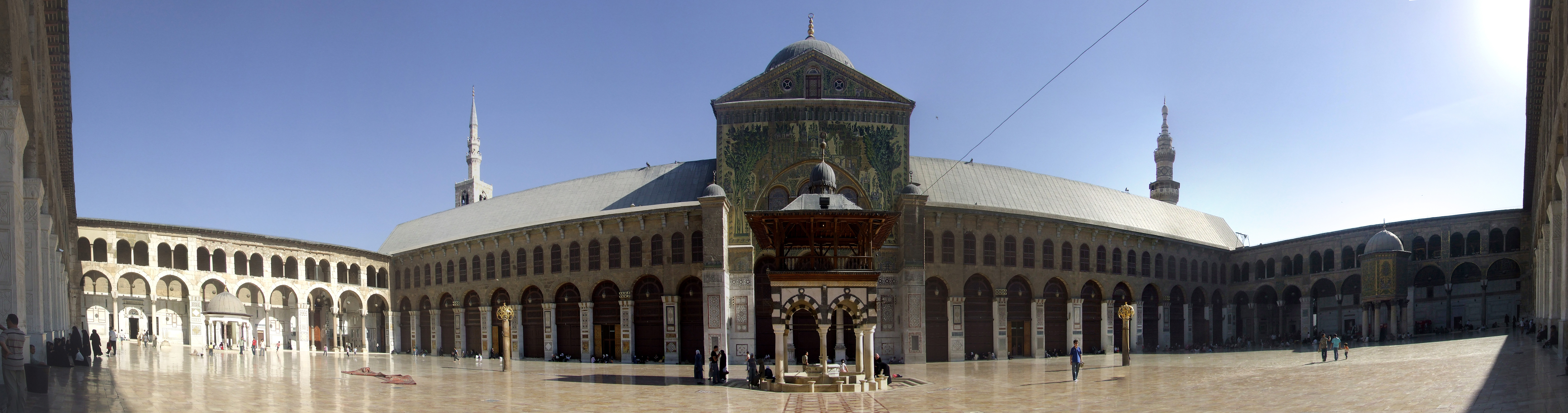
The Umayyad Mosque in Damascus, built in 715, is one of the oldest, largest and best preserved mosques in the world.

In 661, the Rashidun Caliphate shifted into the hands of the Umayyads, who established their capital in Damascus. The Umayyads derived most of their military from Arabs of Syria, and heavily sponsored poetry. They established garrison towns at Ramla, Raqqa, Basra, Kufa, Mosul and Samarra, all of which developed into major cities.

Caliph Abd al-Malik established Arabic as the Caliphate's official language in 686. This reform greatly influenced the conquered non-Arab peoples and fueled the Arabization of the region. However, the Arabs' higher status among non-Arab Muslim converts and the latter's obligation to pay heavy taxes caused resentment. Caliph Umar II strove to resolve the conflict when he came to power in 717. He rectified the disparity, demanding that all Muslims be treated as equals, but his intended reforms did not take effect, as he died after only three years of rule. By now, discontent with the Umayyads swept the region and an uprising occurred in which the Abbasids came to power and moved the capital to Baghdad.

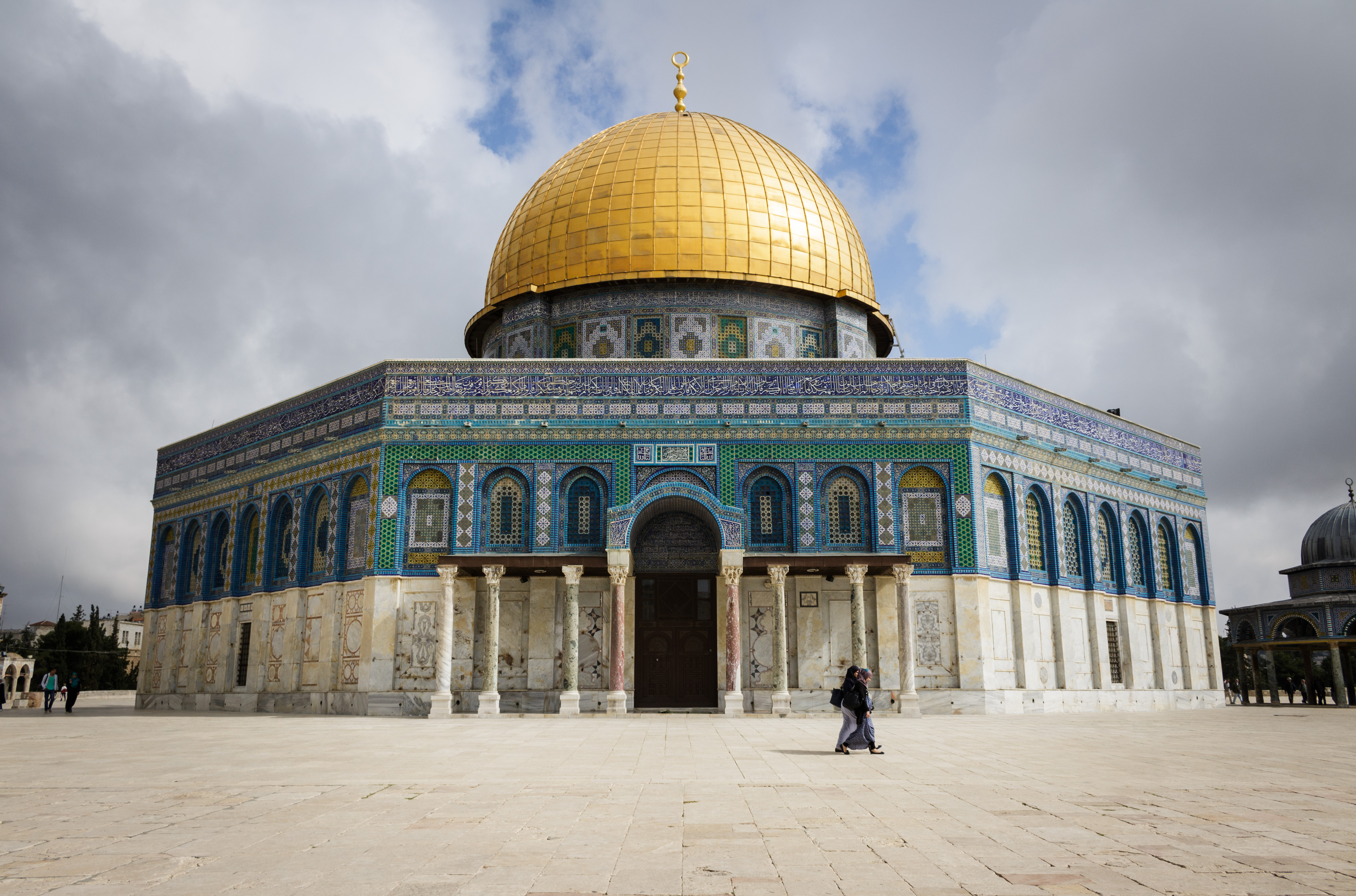
The Dome of the Rock in Jerusalem, constructed during the reign of Abd Al-Malik.

The Umayyads expanded their empire westwards, capturing North Africa from the Byzantines. Before the Arab conquest, North Africa was conquered or settled by various people including Berbers, Punics, Vandals and Romans. After the Abbasid Revolution, the Umayyads lost most of their territories with the exception of Iberia. Their last holding became known as the Emirate of Córdoba. It was during the rule of the grandson of the founder of this new emirate that the state entered a new phase as the Caliphate of Córdoba. This new state was characterized by an expansion of trade, culture and knowledge, and saw the construction of masterpieces of al-Andalus architecture and the library of Al-Ḥakam II which housed over 400,000 volumes. With the collapse of the Umayyad state in 1031 AD, Islamic Spain was divided into small kingdoms.

=== Abbasid Caliphate (750–1258 & 1261–1517) ===
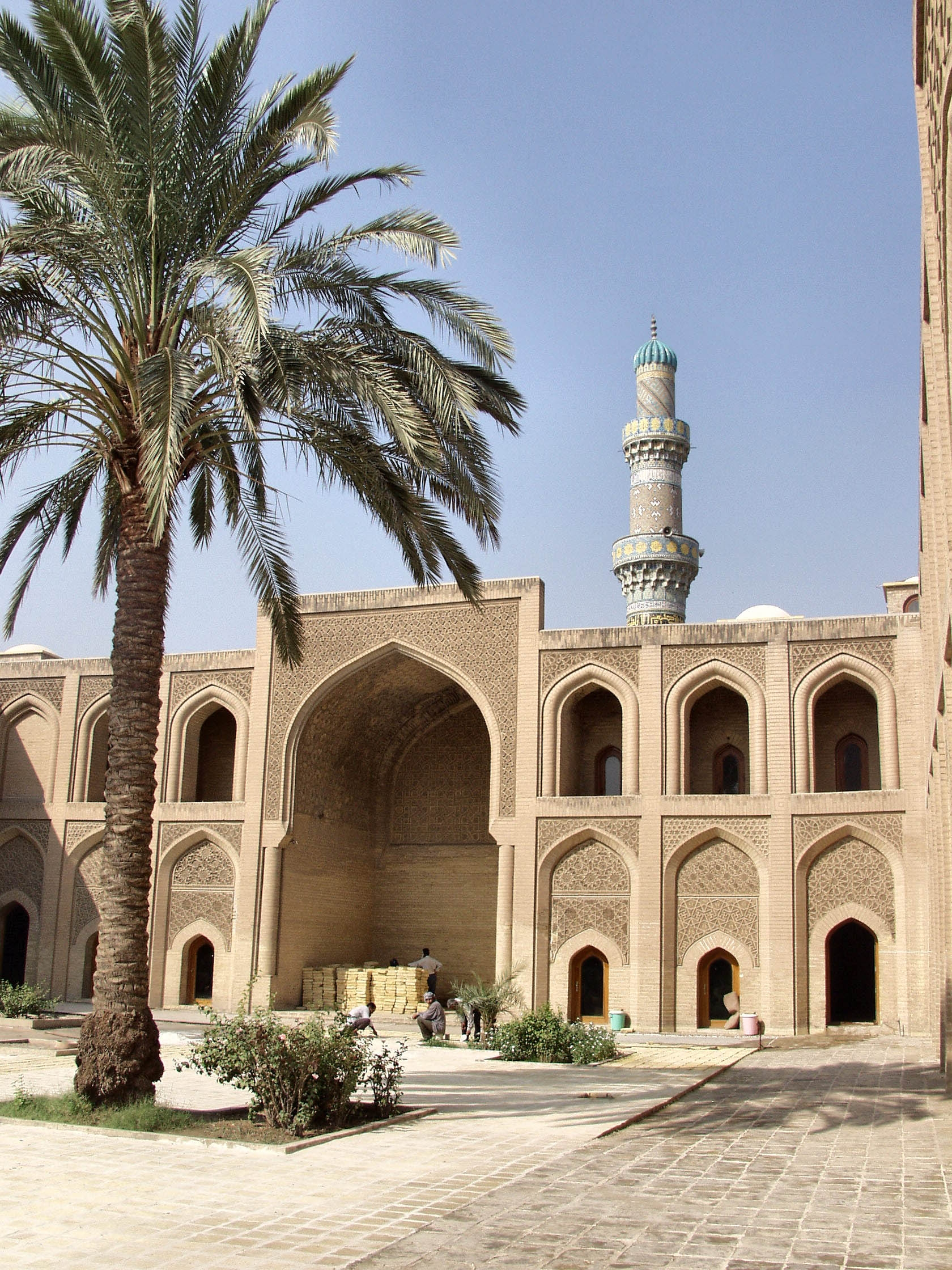
Mustansiriya University in Baghdad.

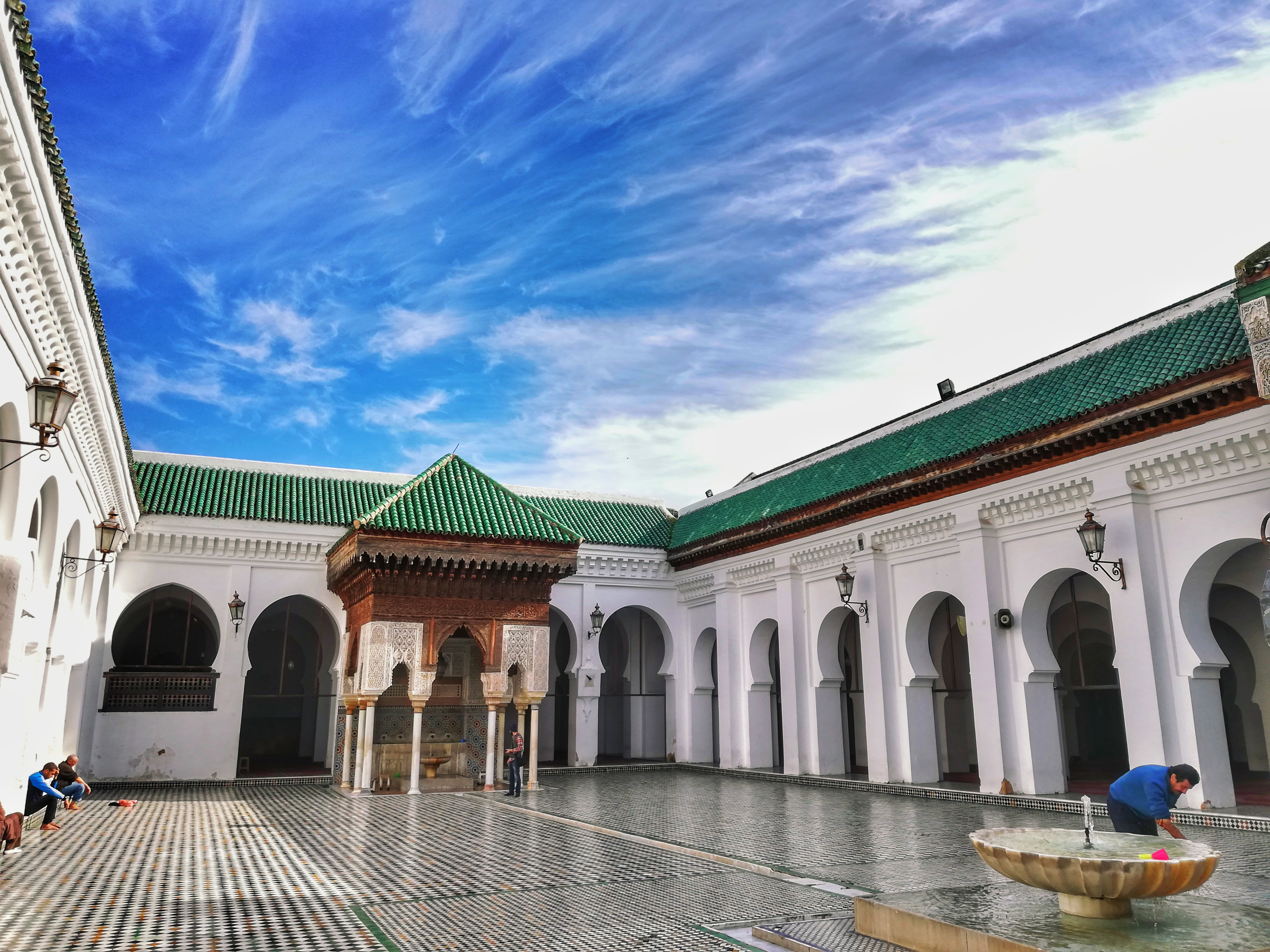
University of al-Qarawiyyin, was founded as a mosque by Fatima al-Fihri in 857–859 in Fez.

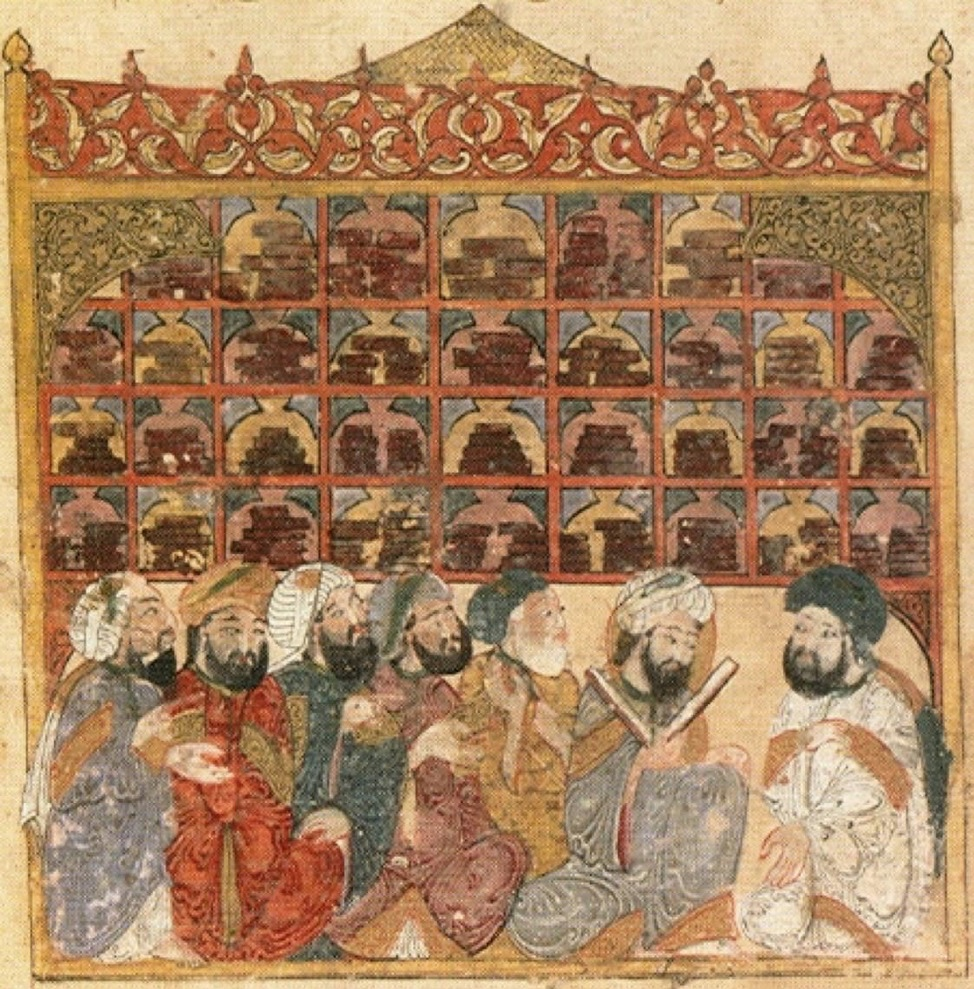
Scholars at an Abbasid library in Baghdad. Maqamat of al-Hariri Illustration, 1237.

The Abbasids were the descendants of Abbas ibn Abd al-Muttalib, one of the youngest uncles of Muhammad and of the same Banu Hashim clan. The Abbasids led a revolt against the Umayyads and defeated them in the Battle of the Zab, effectively ending their rule in all parts of the Empire with the exception of al-Andalus. In 762, the second Abbasid Caliph al-Mansur founded the city of Baghdad and declared it the capital of the Caliphate. Unlike the Umayyads, the Abbasids had the support of non-Arab subjects.

The Islamic Golden Age was inaugurated by the middle of the 8th century by the ascension of the Abbasid Caliphate and the transfer of the capital from Damascus to the newly founded city of Baghdad. The Abbasids were influenced by the Qur'anic injunctions and hadith such as "The ink of the scholar is more holy than the blood of martyrs" stressing the value of knowledge. During this period the Muslim world became an intellectual centre for science, philosophy, medicine and education as the Abbasids championed the cause of knowledge and established the "House of Wisdom" (Arabic: بيت الحكمة) in Baghdad. Rival dynasties such as the Fatimids of Egypt and the Umayyads of al-Andalus were also major intellectual centres with cities such as Cairo and Córdoba rivaling Baghdad.

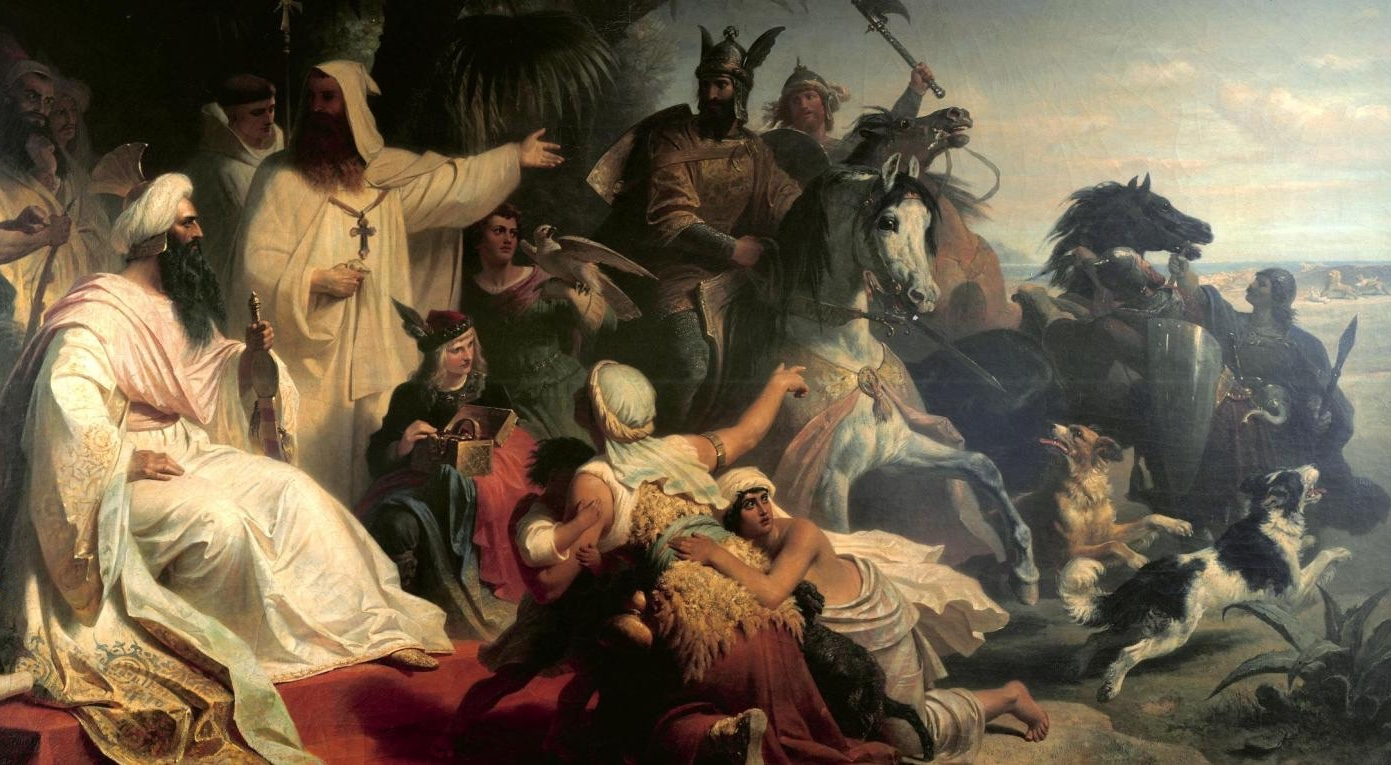
Harun al-Rashid receiving a delegation sent by Charlemagne.

The Abbasids ruled for 200 years before they lost their central control when Wilayas began to fracture in the 10th century; afterwards, in the 1190s, there was a revival of their power, which was ended by the Mongols, who conquered Baghdad in 1258 and killed the Caliph Al-Musta'sim. Members of the Abbasid royal family escaped the massacre and resorted to Cairo, which had broken from the Abbasid rule two years earlier; the Mamluk generals taking the political side of the kingdom while Abbasid Caliphs were engaged in civil activities and continued patronizing science, arts and literature.

=== Fatimid Caliphate (909–1171) ===
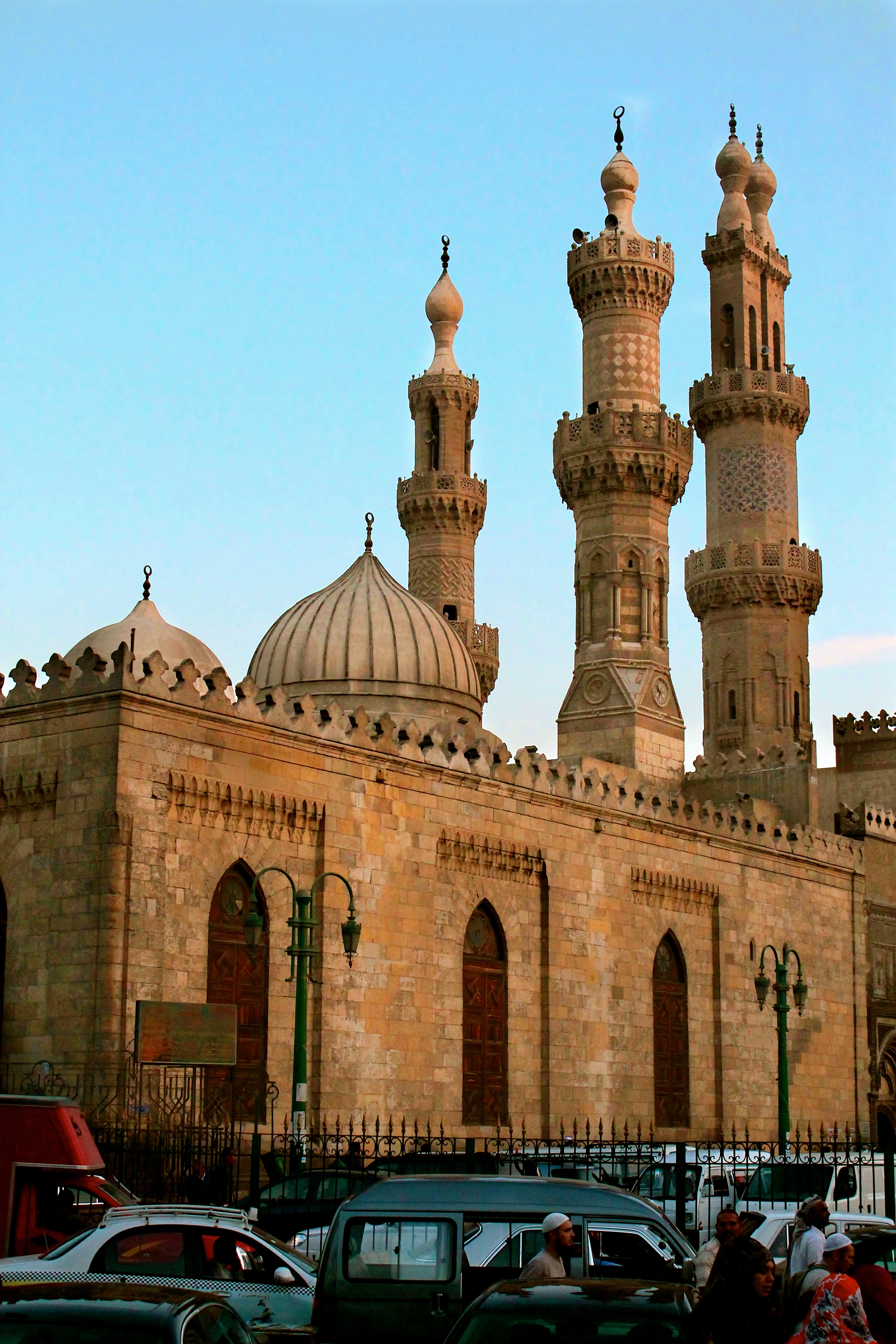
The Al-Azhar Mosque, commissioned by the Fatimid Caliph Al-Mu'izz for the newly established capital city of Cairo in 969.

The Fatimid caliphate was founded by al-Mahdi Billah, a descendant of Fatimah, the daughter of Muhammad, in the early 10th century. Egypt was the political, cultural, and religious centre of the Fatimid empire. The Fatimid state took shape among the Kutama Berbers, in the West of the North African littoral, in Algeria, in 909 conquering Raqqada, the Aghlabid capital. In 921 the Fatimids established the Tunisian city of Mahdia as their new capital. In 948 they shifted their capital to Al-Mansuriya, near Kairouan in Tunisia, and in 969 they conquered Egypt and established Cairo as the capital of their caliphate.

Intellectual life in Egypt during the Fatimid period achieved great progress and activity, due to many scholars who lived in or came to Egypt, as well as the number of books available. Fatimid Caliphs gave prominent positions to scholars in their courts, encouraged students, and established libraries in their palaces, so that scholars might expand their knowledge and reap benefits from the work of their predecessors. The Fatimids were also known for their exquisite arts. Many traces of Fatimid architecture exist in Cairo today; the most defining examples include the Al-Hakim Mosque and the Al-Azhar University.

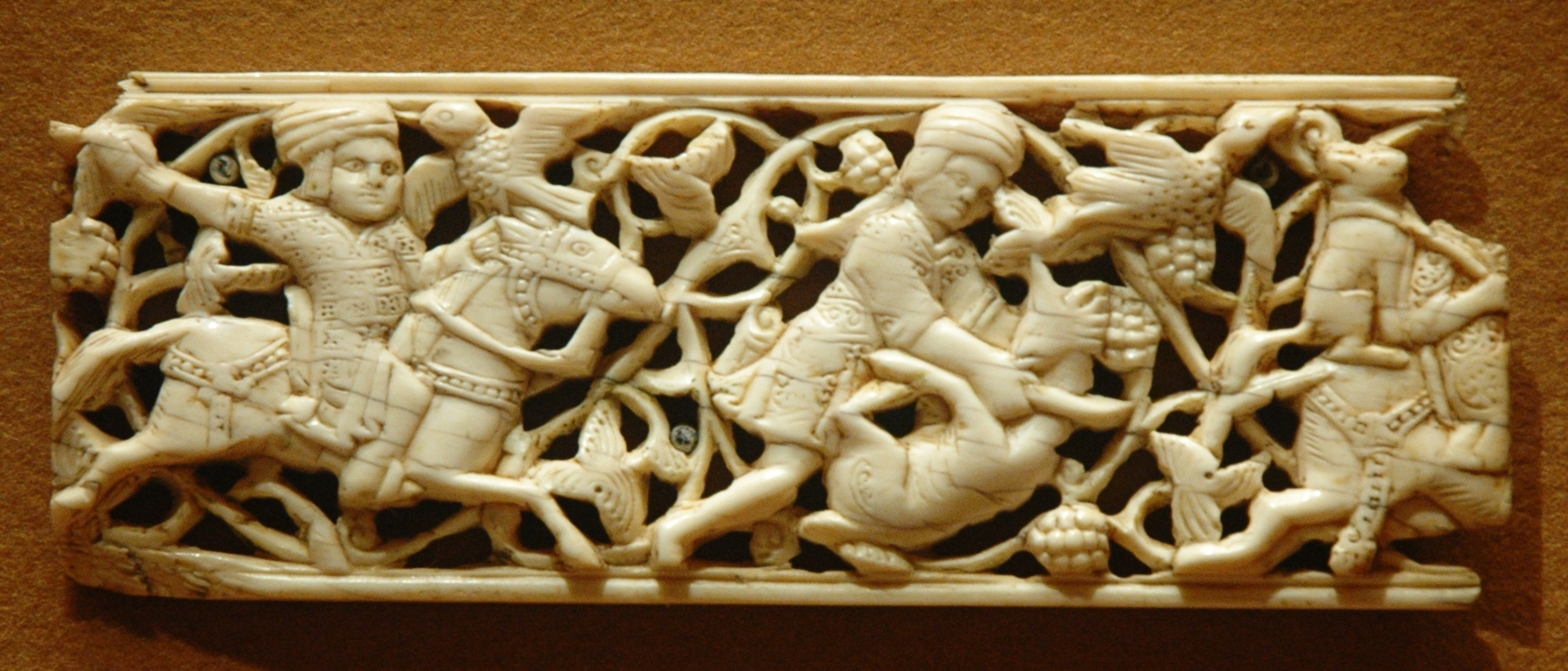
Arabesque pattern behind hunters on ivory plaque, 11th–12th century, Egypt

It was not until the 11th century that the Maghreb saw a large influx of ethnic Arabs. Starting with the 11th century, the Arab bedouin Banu Hilal tribes migrated to the West. Having been sent by the Fatimids to punish the Berber Zirids for abandoning Shias, they travelled westwards. The Banu Hilal quickly defeated the Zirids and deeply weakened the neighboring Hammadids. According to some modern historians, their influx was a major factor in the arabization of the Maghreb. Although Berbers ruled the region until the 16th century (under such powerful dynasties as the Almoravids, the Almohads, Hafsids, etc.).

=== Under the Ottoman Empire (1517-1923) ===
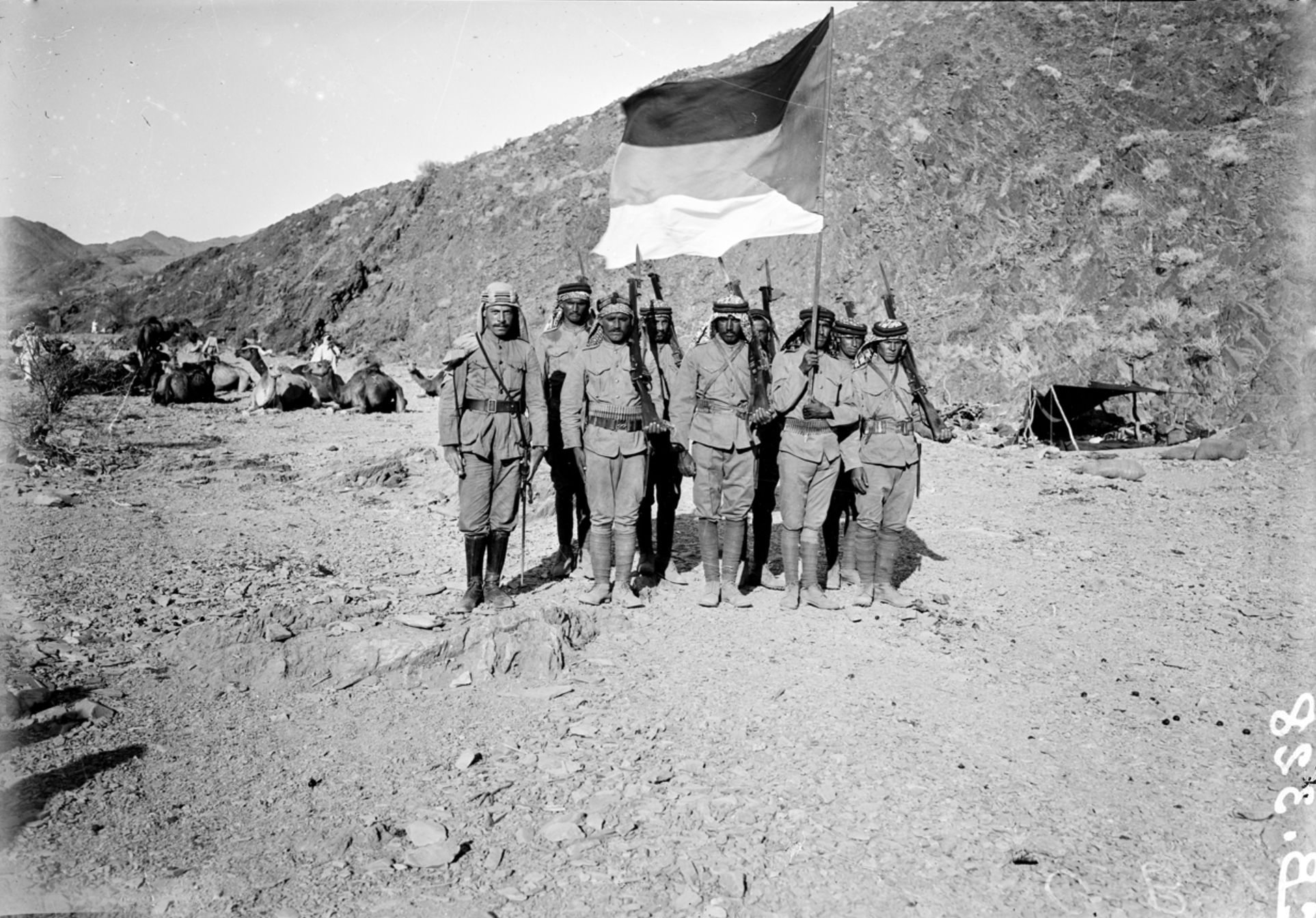
Soldiers of the Arab Army in the Arabian Desert carrying the Flag of the Arab Revolt.

From 1517 to 1918, much of the Arab world was under the suzerainty of the Turkish Ottoman Empire. The Ottomans defeated the Mamluk Sultanate in Cairo, and ended the Abbasid Caliphate. Arabs did not feel the change of administration because the Ottomans modeled their rule after the previous Arab administration systems.

In 1911, Arab intellectuals and politicians from throughout the Levant formed al-Fatat ("the Young Arab Society"), a small Arab nationalist club, in Paris. Its stated aim was "raising the level of the Arab nation to the level of modern nations." In the first few years of its existence, al-Fatat called for greater autonomy within a unified Ottoman state rather than Arab independence from the empire. Al-Fatat hosted the Arab Congress of 1913 in Paris, the purpose of which was to discuss desired reforms with other dissenting individuals from the Arab world. However, as the Ottoman authorities cracked down on the organization's activities and members, al-Fatat went underground and demanded the complete independence and unity of the Arab provinces.

After World War I, when the Ottoman Empire was overthrown by the British Empire, former Ottoman colonies were divided up between the British and French as League of Nations mandates.

== Modern period ==
Most Arabs in modern times live in the Arab world, which comprises 22 countries in Middle East, North Africa, and parts of the Horn of Africa. All are all modern states and became significant as distinct political entities. There is also a large Arab diaspora worldwide following the fall, defeat and dissolution of the Ottoman Empire.

In 1948, Britain withdrew from Palestine and the resulting war caused nearly one million Palestinian Arabs to flee to nearby countries. The events of 1948 are known to Palestinians as the Nakba, meaning "catastrophe." To this day, millions of Palestinians are still displaced from their homes and are unable to return. After the 1948 Arab Israeli war and subsequent conflicts due to antisemitism, pogroms, and state oppression, the vast majority of Jews in the Arab world would migrate to Israel. There would be subsequent wars between Arab countries and Israel in 1956, 1967, 1967–1970, 1973, 1982, and 2006.

On 22 March 1945, the Arab League would be founded in Cairo, originally with only six but currently consisting of 21 member countries. Its goal is to foster cooperation between member countries.

Many Arab countries rely heavily on oil exports to fuel their economies. Iran, Iraq, Kuwait, Saudi Arabia, and Venezuela founded OPEC on 14 September 1960 in Baghdad. OPEC would cease the export of oil to America after the 1973 Yom Kippur War in an attempt to convince the United States to stop supporting Israel. The abundance of oil in the Arab countries has directly and indirectly led to countless wars and prevented Arab countries from diversifying their economies in what some economists calls the "paradox of plenty".

During the Cold War the Arab world would be fought over by the West and East, with both sides supporting and sending troops into various conflicts. The UK would set up the Central Treaty Organization to serve as the Middle East equivalent of NATO in 1955 before it was disbanded in 1979.

In 2011 the Arab Spring would begin in Tunisia and soon spread across the Arab world. During the Arab Spring many Arab countries underwent pro-democracy revolutions against their ruling governments. It would result in the Syrian civil war as well as other conflicts.

In modern times an Arab diaspora of 50 million has been formed by emigrants from Arab countries.
