= The National Council on U.S.-Arab Relations =

American non-profit organization

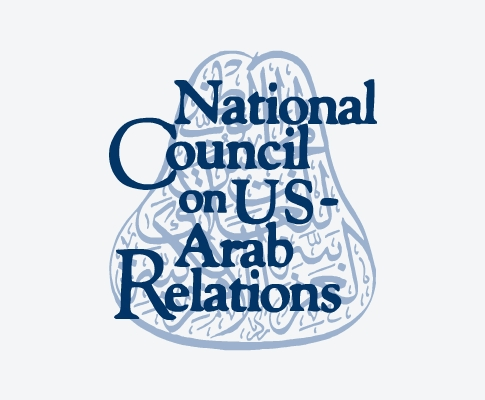
- Abbreviation: NCUSAR
- Formation: 1983; 43 years ago
- Type: 501(c)(3) nonprofit
- Tax ID no.: 52-1296502
- Founder and CEO: Delano Roosevelt
- Website: ncusar.org

The National Council on U.S.-Arab Relations (NCUSAR) is an American non-profit organization with the goal of promoting education about the Arab world in America.

== Background ==
NCUSAR was founded in 1983 as a non-profit organization. The council's stated goal is to increase knowledge and understanding of the Arab world in America. It is located in Washington, D.C., where it hosts public meetings with experts in the field of Arab–U.S. relations. The public seminars cover issues related to politics, the economy, and humanitarian aid, such as U.S. policy in Yemen and the U.S.-Saudi diplomatic relationship. The council is currently led by Delano Roosevelt.

== Mission and activities ==
The council works to promote various programs in order to accomplish its goal, such as educational lectures, publications, and public forums. NCUSAR hosts the annual Arab-U.S. Policymakers Conference, a gathering to discuss issues in the Arab world. It also sponsors the intercollegiate Model Arab League, a student forum similar to the Model United Nations.
