= Model European Parliament =

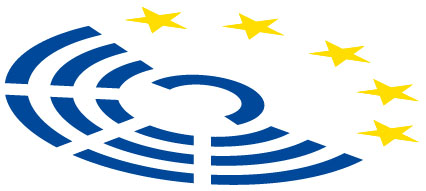
- Frequency: Biannual (spring & autumn)
- Location: Varies
- Years active: Since 1994
- Previous event: 63rd edition (6th March - 13th March 2026): Szeged / Budapest (HU)
- Next event: 64th edition (19th November - 26th November 2026): Porto (PT)
- Participants: 180 students per session
- Leader: Gottfried Oehl
- Organiser: Model European Parliament Association
- Website: mepeurope.eu

The Model European Parliament (MEP) is an international simulation of the working of the European Parliament for students aged 16–19. The aim of the programme is to give young people an insight into the workings of the European Parliament and raise their awareness of European citizenship. Two sessions are held each year, each involving 180 secondary school students.

== Format ==
The format of the MEP resembles that of the actual European Parliament: approximately 15 delegates of different nationalities form a committee that debates a certain topic extensively and drafts a resolution, a non-binding piece of legislation outlining the key issues of the topic and proposing solutions. The drafting process is followed by lobbying, during which delegates may debate and propose amendments for other resolutions. The finale of a session is the General Assembly (GA). During this, resolutions and amendments are debated and voted upon by all of the delegates. Any successful resolutions are then forwarded to the European Parliament, the European Commission and the Council of the European Union. The elder members are titled as Presidents or Chairs, while the youngers are entitled as delegates.

== Participating countries ==
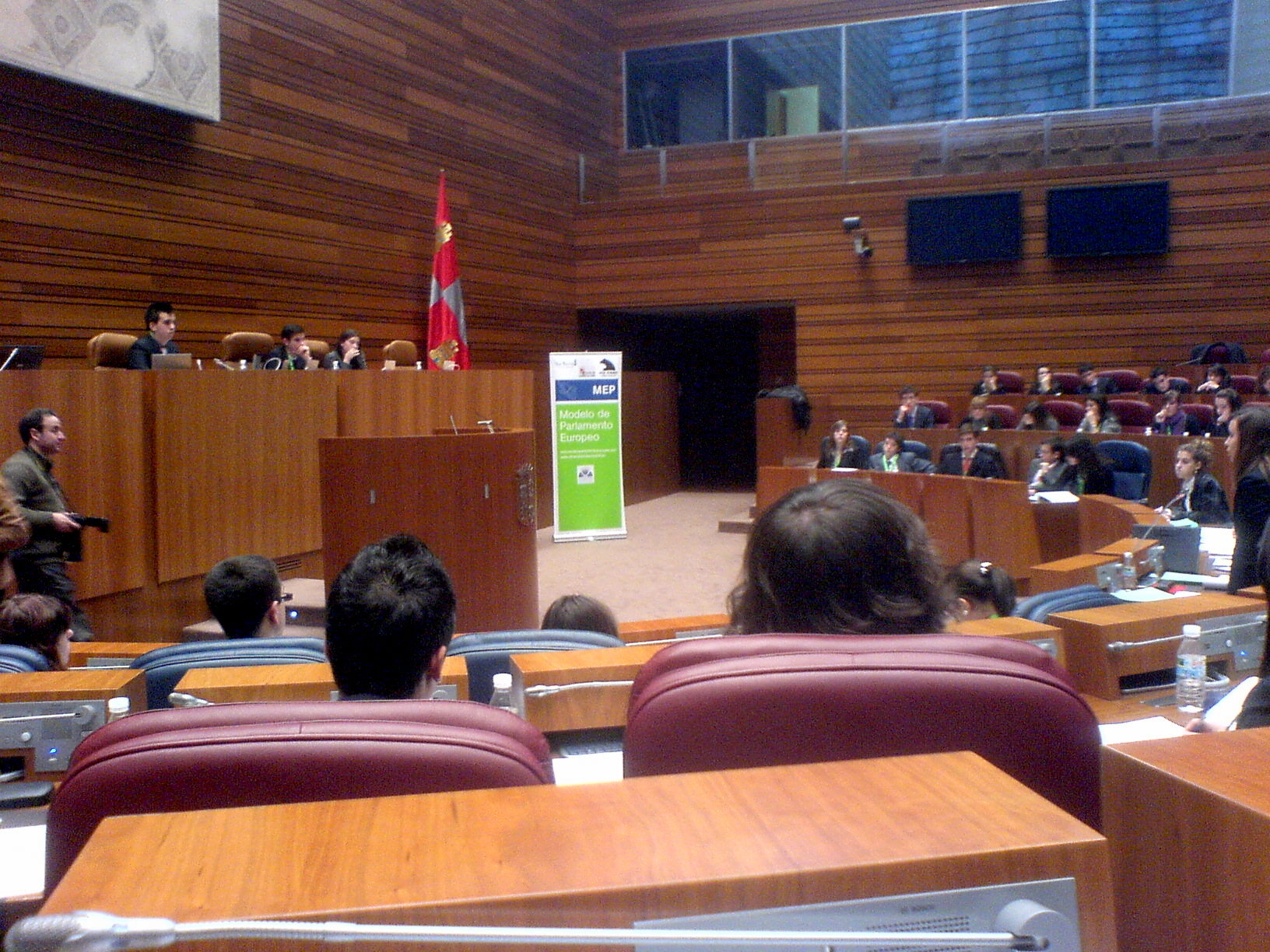
General Assembly of a Spanish regional MEP held in the Cortes (legislative assembly) of Castile and León, 2008/2009

As of 2025, participants come from all 27 member states of the European Union as well as five of the nine candidate countries for membership, North Macedonia, Turkey, Serbia, Montenegro and Albania. There are also three guest countries of the MEP which also participate, including Iceland, Norway and the United Kingdom. Each country can choose five delegates in any way they deem appropriate. Many hold regional and/or national sessions using the same format but with a narrower scope.

== Connections to politics ==
Famous members of the European Parliament often visit the MEP, hold speeches and participate in debates. Some delegates of the international session in Brussels in February 2023 had the honour to be welcomed by the President of the European Parliament Roberta Metsola. Also the First Vice President of the European Parliament Othmar Karas and the Vice Presidents Rainer Wieland and Evelyn Regner visited the session in several parts of the programme. The General Assembly of the sessions is often held in real Parliamentary or governmental buildings of the hosting country, region or city or the European Union. In 2019 there was a General Assembly in the real building of the European Parliament in Strasbourg. The international session in February 2023 in Brussels had the General Assembly in the building of the European Committee of the Regions. Also national parliaments like the Narodno Sabranie in Sofia, Bulgaria, hosted international sessions in their plenary hall. At the 62nd Session in The Hague, Mark Rutte held an event with the delegates.

== List of international sessions ==
The following international sessions have been held or announced:

1. 1994 Spring: Netherlands, The Hague/Maastricht
2. 1995 Spring: Netherlands, The Hague
3. 1996 Spring: France, Paris
4. 1996 Autumn: Ireland, Dublin
5. 1997 Spring: United Kingdom, Stowe/Oxford
6. 1997 Autumn: Italy, Carpi/Bologna
7. 1998 Spring: Sweden, Stockholm
8. 1998 Autumn: Spain, Madrid
9. 1999 Spring: Germany, Bonn
10. 1999 Autumn: Luxembourg, Luxembourg
11. 2000 Spring: Portugal, Lisbon
12. 2000 Autumn: Austria, Vienna
13. 2001 Spring: Denmark, Copenhagen
14. 2001 Autumn: Netherlands, Rotterdam
15. 2002 Spring: Slovenia, Ljubljana
16. 2002 Autumn: Ireland, Dublin
17. 2003 Spring: Finland, Helsinki
18. 2003 Autumn: Greece, Athens
19. 2004 Spring: Poland, Warsaw
20. 2004 Spring: Luxembourg, Luxembourg
21. 2004 Autumn: Hungary, Budapest
22. 2005 Spring: Netherlands, The Hague
23. 2005 Autumn: Spain, Madrid
24. 2006 Spring: Lithuania, Vilnius
25. 2006 Autumn: Slovenia, Ljutomer / Ljubljana
26. 2007 Spring: Bulgaria, Sofia
27. 2007 Autumn: Italy, Rome
28. 2008 Spring: Sweden, Stockholm
29. 2008 Autumn: Slovak Republic, Bratislava
30. 2009 Spring: Cyprus, Nicosia
31. 2009 Autumn: Germany, Bonn
32. 2010 Spring: Netherlands, The Hague
33. 2010 Autumn: Turkey, Istanbul
34. 2011 Spring: Estonia, Tallinn
35. 2011 Autumn: North Macedonia, Skopje
36. 2012 Spring: Slovenia, Ljutomer / Ljubljana
37. 2012 Autumn: Spain, Madrid
38. 2013 Spring: United Kingdom, Norwich
39. 2013 Autumn: Lithuania, Vilnius
40. 2014 Spring: Austria, Vienna
41. 2014 Autumn: Luxembourg, Luxembourg
42. 2015 Spring: Italy, Naples / Rome
43. 2015 Autumn: Germany, Berlin
44. 2016 Spring: Hungary, Budapest
45. 2016 Autumn: Denmark, Copenhagen
46. 2017 Spring: Netherlands, Maastricht
47. 2017 Autumn: Finland, Helsinki
48. 2018 Spring: Estonia, Tallinn
49. 2018 Autumn: Spain, Toledo / Madrid
50. 2019 Spring: France, Paris / Strasbourg
51. 2019 Autumn: Malta, Valletta
52. 2020 Autumn: Sweden, Stockholm (online)
53. 2021 Spring: Austria, Vienna (online)
54. 2021 Autumn: Germany, Berlin (online)
55. 2022 Spring: Romania, Bucharest
56. 2022 Autumn: Bulgaria, Sofia
57. 2023 Spring: Belgium, Brussels
58. 2023 Autumn: Czech Republic, Prague
59. 2024 Spring: Estonia, Tallinn
60. 2024 Autumn: Greece, Athens
61. 2025 Spring: France, Strasbourg / Germany, Kehl
62. 2025 Autumn: Netherlands, The Hague
63. 2026 Spring: Hungary, Szeged / Budapest
64. 2026 Autumn: Portugal, Porto
65. 2027 Spring: Austria, Vienna
66. 2027 Autumn: Poland, Warsaw
67. 2028 Spring: Italy, Naples
68. 2028 Autumn: Latvia, Riga

== Model European Parliament Baltic Sea Region ==
The Model European Parliament Baltic Sea Region (MEP BSR) is an international organization that includes eight member states of the EU situated in the Baltic Sea Region, but also welcomes delegates from Iceland, Norway and Russia (Kaliningrad). The MEP BSR, which is organised and managed by the Model European Parliament BSR Association, uses the same format as the main international MEPs, but with ten delegates representing each country rather than five.

List of MEP BSR sessions:

1. 2005 Spring: Denmark, Copenhagen
2. 2006 Spring: Estonia, Tallinn
3. 2006 Autumn: Germany, Bremen
4. 2007 Spring: Denmark/Sweden, Øresund Region
5. 2007 Autumn: Latvia, Riga
6. 2008 Spring: Finland, Helsinki
7. 2008 Autumn: Russia, St. Petersburg
8. 2009 Spring: Poland, Toruń
9. 2009 Autumn: Denmark, Copenhagen
10. 2010 Spring: Sweden, Stockholm
11. 2010 Autumn: Russia, Kaliningrad
12. 2011 Spring: Lithuania, Vilnius
13. 2011 Autumn: Poland, Gdańsk/Gdynia
14. 2012 Spring: Denmark, Copenhagen
15. 2012 Autumn: Germany, Leipzig
16. 2013 Spring: Iceland, Reykjavik
17. 2013 Autumn: Belgium, Brugge/Blankenberge
18. 2014 Spring: Estonia, Tartu
19. 2014 Autumn: Sweden, Stockholm
20. 2015 Spring: Finland, Helsinki
21. 2015 Autumn: Norway, Oslo/Nesbru
22. 2016 Spring: Latvia, Riga
23. 2016 Autumn: Russia, Kaliningrad
24. 2017 Spring: Norway, Elverum
25. 2017 Autumn: Latvia, Riga
26. 2018 Spring: Poland, Iława
27. 2018 Autumn: Denmark, Sønderborg
28. 2019 Spring: Denmark, Copenhagen
29. 2019 Autumn: Austria, Vienna
30. 2021 Autumn: Denmark, Copenhagen
31. 2022 Autumn: Germany, Potsdam
32. 2023 Autumn: Norway, Oslo
33. 2024: Autumn:Denmark, Copenhagen
34. 2025: Autumn:Finland, Helsinki
35. 2026: Autumn:Estonia, Kuressare

== Model European Parliament Central and South East Europe ==
The Model European Parliament Central and South East Europe (MEP CSEE) is an organisation largely similar to MEP BSR, but it invites students from member states Austria, Slovenia, the Czech Republic, Germany, Slovakia, Hungary, Romania, Bulgaria, candidate countries the Republic of Macedonia, Serbia, and neighbouring countries Moldova, Bosnia-Herzegovina and Montenegro.

List of MEP CSEE sessions:

1. 2001 Autumn: Austria, Vienna
2. 2002 Autumn: Italy, Capri/Rome
3. 2003 Autumn: Slovenia, Ljutomer
4. 2015 Autumn: Romania, Bucharest
5. 2016 Autumn: Bulgaria, Sofia
6. 2018 Spring: Slovenia, Ljutomer
7. 2018 Autumn: Austria, Vienna
8. 2019 Autumn: Hungary, Budapest
9. 2021 Spring: Slovak Republic, Bratislava (online)
10. 2021 Autumn: Romania, Bucharest (online)
11. 2022 Autumn: Hungary, Szeged
12. 2024 Spring: Germany, Munich
13. 2025 Winter: Slovakia, Bratislava
14. 2026 Spring: Bulgaria, Plovdiv

== Model European Parliament Western European Region ==
A Western European version was launched in Autumn 2016 with the participation of Belgium, France, Germany, the United Kingdom, Luxembourg, Ireland and the Netherlands.

List of WEMEP sessions:

1. 2016 Autumn: Netherlands, The Hague
2. 2018 Spring: Belgium, Lier
3. 2019 Spring: Germany, Koblenz/Bonn
4. 2020 Spring: Luxembourg, Luxembourg City
5. 2023 Spring: The Netherlands, The Hague
6. 2024 Spring: Belgium, Lier
7. 2025 Spring: Belgium, Brussels
8. 2026 Spring: Luxembourg, Luxembourg City

== Model European Parliament Mediterranean Region ==
The Model European Parliament Mediterranean Region is a non-partisan leadership programme for youth in Mediterranean countries. The aim of the MED MEP Region programme is to develop interest and skills in addressing high level international issues jointly among high-school students. The program is a training ground for future leaders and politicians, and is mainly aimed at Italy, Croatia, Albania, Greece, Spain, Portugal, Malta, Cyprus, France and Turkey

List of MEP MED sessions:

1. 2017 Autumn: Italy, Naples
2. 2018: Autumn: Greece, Athens
3. 2019: Autumn: Cyprus, Nicosia
4. 2022: Autumn: Italy, Milan
5. 2025: Spring: Spain, Madrid
6. 2026: Autumn: Greece, Zakynthos

== Similar projects ==
The European Youth Parliament and Model European Union are separate projects, but follow the same format as the Model European Parliament to some extent.

== See also ==
- Model United Nations
