= Alexandria Protocol =

1944 agreement between Arab states

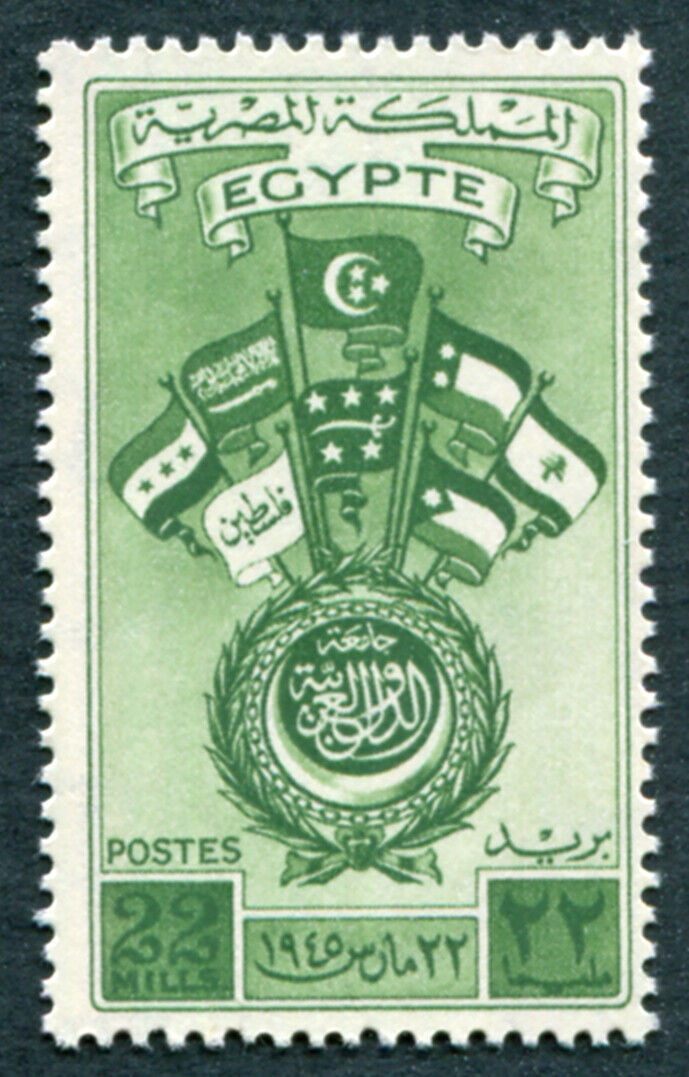
An Egyptian stamp issued in both purple and green, in 1945, featuring the flags of the founding Arab League members. From left to right: Republic of Syria, Kingdom of Saudi Arabia, Kingdom of Egypt, Hashemite Kingdom of Iraq, Republic of Lebanon, a white placeholder flag with the word Palestine in Arabic, Mutwakilite Kingdom of Yemen, and Hashemite Kingdom of Jordan.

The Alexandria Protocol (Arab: بروتوكول الإسكندرية) was an agreement signed on 7 October 1944, in Alexandria, by five Arab countries agreeing to the formation of a joint Arab Organization, which led to the formation of the eight-member League of Arab States in the following year.

The agreement stated that all participating countries will be represented on an equal footing. The main aim of this organization was to strengthen the relations between Arab states and to participate actively in the coordination of their political plans and foreign policy without interference with their independence but promising protection by suitable means in case of aggression against a member state and its sovereignty.

The meeting in Alexandria included five committees with representatives of the future members of the Arab League countries in the Middle East.

== Signing members ==
- Egypt: Nagib al-Hilali Pasha, Minister of Education, Muhammad Sabri Abu 'Alam Pasha, Minister of - Justice, Muhammad Salah-al-din Bey, Under Secretary of State of the Ministry of Foreign Affairs,
- Iraq: Hamdi al-Bahjaji, Iraqi Prime Minister and head of the Iraqi delegation, Arshad al-'Umari, Minister of Foreign Affairs, Nuri al-Sa'id, former Iraqi Prime Minister, Tahein al-'Askari, Iraqi Minister Plenipotentiary in Egypt
- Syria: Saadallah al-Jabiri, Syrian Prime Minister and head of the Syrian delegation, Jamil Mardam Bey, Minister of Foreign Affairs, Dr. Nagib al-Armanazi, Secretary General of the Presidency of the Syrian Republic, M. Sabri al-Assali, deputy of Damascus.
- Jordan (then Transjordan): Tawfiq Abu al-Huda Pasha, Trans-Jordanian Prime Minister and Minister Of Foreign Affairs, head of the Trans-Jordanian delegation, Sulayman al-Sukkar Bey, Financial Secretary of the Ministry of Foreign Affairs.
- Lebanon: with the president Bechara El Khoury, Riyad al-Sulh Bey, Lebanese Prime Minister and head of the Lebanese delegation, Salim Taqla Bey, Minister of Foreign Affairs, Musa Mubarak, Chief of the Presidential Cabinet.

== See also ==
- Charter of the Arab League
