= Member states of the Arab League =

Arab League member states and communities

League of Arab States: جامعة الدول العربية (Arabic) Jāmiʿat ad-Duwal al-ʿArabiyya
- Flag

- Member states shown in dark green

The Arab League has 22 member states. It was founded in Cairo, Egypt, in March 1945 with seven members, namely the Kingdom of Egypt, the Kingdom of Iraq, Lebanon, Saudi Arabia, the Syrian Republic, Transjordan, (Note: Jordan from 1949.) and North Yemen. (Note: Later became Yemen after its unification with South Yemen from 1990.) Membership increased during the second half of the 20th century. Seven countries have observer status. The headquarters are located in Cairo, Egypt.

== List of current member states ==
Country	Admission date	Capital	Area (km^{2})	Population (2024)	Official languages
Algeria	16 August 1962	Algiers	2,381,741	47,022,473	Arabic, Tamazight
Bahrain	11 September 1971	Manama	750	1,566,888	Arabic
Comoros	20 November 1993	Moroni	2,235	900,141	Arabic, Comorian, French
Djibouti	4 September 1977	Djibouti	23,200	994,974	Arabic, French
Egypt	22 March 1945	Cairo	1,002,450	111,247,248	Arabic
Iraq	22 March 1945	Baghdad	438,317	42,083,436	Arabic, Kurdish
Jordan	22 March 1945	Amman	89,342	11,174,024	Arabic
Kuwait	20 July 1961	Kuwait City	18,717	3,138,355	Arabic
Lebanon	22 March 1945	Beirut	10,452	5,364,482	Arabic
Libya	28 March 1953	Tripoli	1,759,541	7,361,263	Arabic
Mauritania	26 November 1973	Nouakchott	1,030,700	4,328,040	Arabic
Morocco	1 October 1958	Rabat	446,550	37,387,585	Arabic, Tamazight
Oman	29 September 1971	Muscat	309,550	3,901,992	Arabic
Palestine	9 September 1976	Jerusalem (de jure); Ramallah (de facto)	6,040	5,385,012	Arabic
Qatar	11 September 1971	Doha	11,437	2,552,088	Arabic
Saudi Arabia	22 March 1945	Riyadh	2,149,690	36,544,431	Arabic
Somalia	14 February 1974	Mogadishu	637,661	13,017,273	Somali, Arabic
Sudan	19 January 1956	Khartoum	1,886,068	50,467,278	Arabic, English
Syria	22 March 1945	Damascus	185,180	23,865,423	Arabic
Tunisia	1 October 1958	Tunis	163,610	12,048,847	Arabic
United Arab Emirates	6 December 1971	Abu Dhabi	83,600	10,032,213	Arabic
Yemen	22 March 1945 (North Yemen); 30 November 1967 (South Yemen); 22 May 1990 (Unified Yemen)	Sana'a (de jure); Aden (de facto)	527,968	32,140,443	Arabic
Libya's seat is taken by the House of Representatives (which is disputed by the Muslim Brotherhood-led General National Congress and Government of National Accord); Palestine's area of 6,040 km^{2} consists of the West Bank and the Gaza Strip which is governed by the Palestinian National Authority; The Syrian Arab Republic was suspended on 16 November 2011 and readmitted on 7 May 2023. During this time, Syria's seat was occupied by the Syrian National Coalition until 2014. Yemen's seat is taken by the Presidential Leadership Council (which is disputed by the Supreme Political Council)

== List of current observer states ==
Seven countries are observer states, a status that entitles them to express their opinion and give advice but denies them voting rights. These are Eritrea, where Arabic is one of the official languages, as well as Brazil and Venezuela, which have large and influential Arab communities. India is another observer of the Arab League, with a sizable number of people claiming Arab descent and millions of Indian expatriates living and working in the Arab world. Armenia was granted observer status in 2004. Chad was granted observer status in 2005. Greece became an observer state in 2021.

Country	Admission date	Capital	Area (km^{2})	Population (2024)	Official/working languages
Armenia	2004	Yerevan	29,743	2,976,765	Armenian
Brazil	2003	Brasília	8,515,767	220,051,512	Portuguese
Chad	April 2005	N'Djamena	1,284,000	19,093,595	French, Arabic
Eritrea	January 2003	Asmara	117,600	6,343,956	Tigrinya, English, Arabic
Greece	2021	Athens	131,445	10,461,091	Greek
India	April 2007	New Delhi	3,287,263	1,409,128,296	Hindi, English
Venezuela	September 2006	Caracas	916,445	31,250,306	Spanish

== Membership timeline ==
Arab League Enlargements

1945-founding members: Egypt, Jordan, Iraq, Lebanon, Saudi Arabia, Syria, Yemen

1958 – Third Enlargement: Morocco, Tunisia

1967-1971 – Seventh Enlargement: South Yemen, UAE, Oman, Bahrain, Qatar

1993– Twelfth (Latest) Enlargement: Comoros ---
2011– Shrinkage: Secession of South Sudan

- 1942 – Egypt; France and United Kingdom promote the idea of the Arab League.
- 1945 – Leaders of seven states in the Middle East signed the Alexandria Protocol, thus establishing the first Organization with a Pan-Arabic ideology in the 20th century. The founding members were Egypt, Iraq, Lebanon, Syria, Saudi Arabia, Jordan (entering under the name of Transjordan), and Yemen (which from 1967 was generally known under the name North Yemen).
- 1953 – Libya joins the Arab League two years after independence.
- 19 January 1956 – Sudan joins the Arab League, two weeks after independence from the United Kingdom and Egypt.
- 1 October 1958 – Morocco and Tunisia join the Arab League, two years after independence.
- 20 July 1961 – Kuwait joins the League 31 days after independence, and becomes the first Asian state to join the League after the founding states.
- 16 August 1962 – Algeria accedes to the Arab League, less than two months after independence.
- 1967 – South Yemen joins the Arab League upon its independence.
- 1971 – the United Arab Emirates, Oman, Qatar and Bahrain join the Arab League.
- 26 November 1973 – Mauritania joins the Arab League thirteen years after independence.
- 14 February 1974 – Somalia joins the Arab League fourteen years after independence.
- 9 September 1976 – Palestinian Liberation Organisation joins the Arab League. Its seat is assumed by the State of Palestine following the Declaration of Independence in 1988.
- 4 September 1977 – Djibouti joins the Arab League two months after its independence from France that same year.
- 26 March 1979 – Egypt suspended from the Arab League; readmitted on 23 May 1989.
- 22 May 1990 – North and South Yemen unify.
- 1993 – The Comoros accede to the Arab League.
- January 2003 – Eritrea joins the Arab League as an observer.
- 2003 – Brazil joins the Arab League as an observer for one summit.
- 2004 – Armenia joins the Arab League as an observer.
- April 2005 – Chad joins the Arab League as an observer.
- September 2006 – Venezuela joins the Arab League as an observer for one summit.
- April 2007 – India joins the Arab League as an observer state for the summit.
- 22 February 2011 – Libya suspended from the Arab League; readmitted on 25 August 2011.
- July 2011 – South Sudan gains independence from Sudan, but does not join the Arab League.
- 16 November 2011 – Syria suspended from the Arab League.
- 7 May 2023 – Syria readmitted to the Arab League.

== Potential members and observers ==
Only two countries where Arabic is an official language remain outside of the League, Chad and Mali. In Eritrea and South Sudan, although Arabic is not an official language, a dialect of the language is spoken by portions of the populations in these countries. Additionally, there are two other Arabic-speaking states with limited recognition, namely Sahrawi Arab Democratic Republic and Somaliland, but their disputed status being claimed by League members Morocco and Somalia respectively, makes their membership unlikely for the foreseeable future.

Chad's membership was endorsed by the Egyptian government under Hosni Mubarak in 2010. Chad applied for membership on 25 March 2014. Arabic is one of its two official languages, some 12% of Chadians identify as Arab and around 900,000 are Arabic-speaking. Chad has had observer status since 2005.

South Sudan declared its independence from League member state Sudan in July 2011. A clause in the Charter of the Arab League accords the right of territories that have seceded from an Arab League member state to join the organization. South Sudan has been assured full membership in the Arab League should its government choose to seek it. Instead, the nation could opt for observer status. It has indicated that it would not be joining the League since the government believes it does not meet the pre-conditions for membership, stating that:

"The League requires that the countries must be Arabic-speaking countries that consider Arabic language the main language of the nation — on top of that, the league also requires that the people of that particular country must believe that they are Arabs. The people of Southern Sudan are not of Arabic origin, so I don't think there will be anybody in Southern Sudan who will consider joining the Arab League."

In an interview with Asharq Al-Awsat, the Foreign Minister of South Sudan Deng Alor Kuol said:

"South Sudan is the closest African country to the Arab world, and we speak a special kind of Arabic known as Juba Arabic."

Sudan supports South Sudan’s request to join the Arab League. South Sudan applied for observer status in March 2018.

The Sahrawi Arab Democratic Republic is not a member though it is recognized by some Arab League states. Its status is disputed, its territory being claimed by League member Morocco, which makes its membership unlikely for the foreseeable future.

Latin America and the Caribbean are the home of a large, influential Arab population, who mostly reside in Mexico, Honduras, Argentina, Venezuela, Brazil, Colombia, Peru, Uruguay, Chile, Panama, Ecuador, Jamaica, Haiti and Guatemala. However, these countries use Dutch, Spanish, Portuguese, English and French as official languages and have demonstrated little interest in joining the Arab League. Brazil and Venezuela are the only two observers in the League.

== Suspensions ==
=== Egypt ===
Egypt's membership was suspended in March 1979 after it signed the Egypt–Israel peace treaty and the League's headquarters were moved from Cairo to Tunis. In 1987, Arab League states restored diplomatic relations with Egypt, the country was readmitted to the League in May 1989 and the League's headquarters were moved back to Cairo in September 1990.

=== Libya ===
Libya was suspended from the Arab League on 22 February 2011, following the start of the Libyan Civil War and the use of military force against civilians. That makes Libya the second country in the League's history to have a frozen membership. Libyan leader Muammar Gaddafi declared that the League was illegitimate, saying: "The Arab League is finished. There is no such thing as the Arab League". On 27 August 2011, the Arab League voted to restore Libya's membership by accrediting a representative of the National Transitional Council, which was partially recognised as the interim government of the country in the wake of Gaddafi's ouster from the capital of Tripoli.

=== Syria ===
On 20 September 2011, the Arab Parliament recommended the suspension of Syria and Yemen over persistent reports of disproportionate violence against regime opponents and activists during the Arab Spring. On 12 November 2011, the League passed a decree that would suspend Ba'athist Syrian Arab Republic's membership if the government failed to stop violence against civilian protesters by 16 November 2011 amidst the uprising. Syria, Lebanon and Yemen voted against the motion, and Iraq abstained. Despite the opportunity, the Syrian government did not yield to the League's demands, resulting in its indefinite suspension. There was criticism after the Arab League sent in December 2011 a commission "monitoring" violence on people protesting against the regime. The commission was headed by Mohammad Ahmed Mustafa al-Dabi, who served as head of Omar al-Bashir's military intelligence, while war crimes, including genocide, were allegedly committed on his watch. On 6 March 2013, the Arab League granted the Syrian National Coalition Syria's seat in the Arab League. On 9 March 2014, the League's secretary General Nabil al-Arabi said that Syria's seat in the Arab League would remain vacant until the opposition completes the formation of its institutions.

In 2021, the Arab League initiated a process of normalisation between Syria and other Arab nations. In the aftermath of the 2023 Turkey-Syria earthquake, Saudi Arabia, Egypt, Jordan, the United Arab Emirates, Tunisia as well as Oman and Bahrain had sought better relations with Syria. There is a consensus in the Arab world that the isolation of the Syrian government is not conducive to peace and prosperity in the region.

On 7 May 2023, at the meeting of the Council of the Arab League composed of foreign ministers in Cairo, was agreed to reinstate Syria's membership. Earlier, Kuwait and Qatar had opposed Bashar al-Assad’s presence at the Arab League summit. The regional normalisation effort had caught the U.S. and its European allies by surprise, as they were opposing a Jordan-led "Arab-led political initiative" in solving the crisis. According to the statement, al-Assad would be allowed to the meeting on 19 May 2023, if "he wishes to do so". Nevertheless, Syria remains under international sanctions after millions of Syrians had been displaced or sought refuge in Arab and European countries during the civil war. The changes to the relations between Syria and other Arab States would allow many of them to return to their homeland, according to the announcements made earlier by Jordanian and Saudi officials.

== See also ==
- List of Arab League countries by population
- Member states of the Cooperation Council for the Arab States of the Gulf
- Organisation of Islamic Cooperation
- United Arab Command
