= Model European Union Strasbourg =

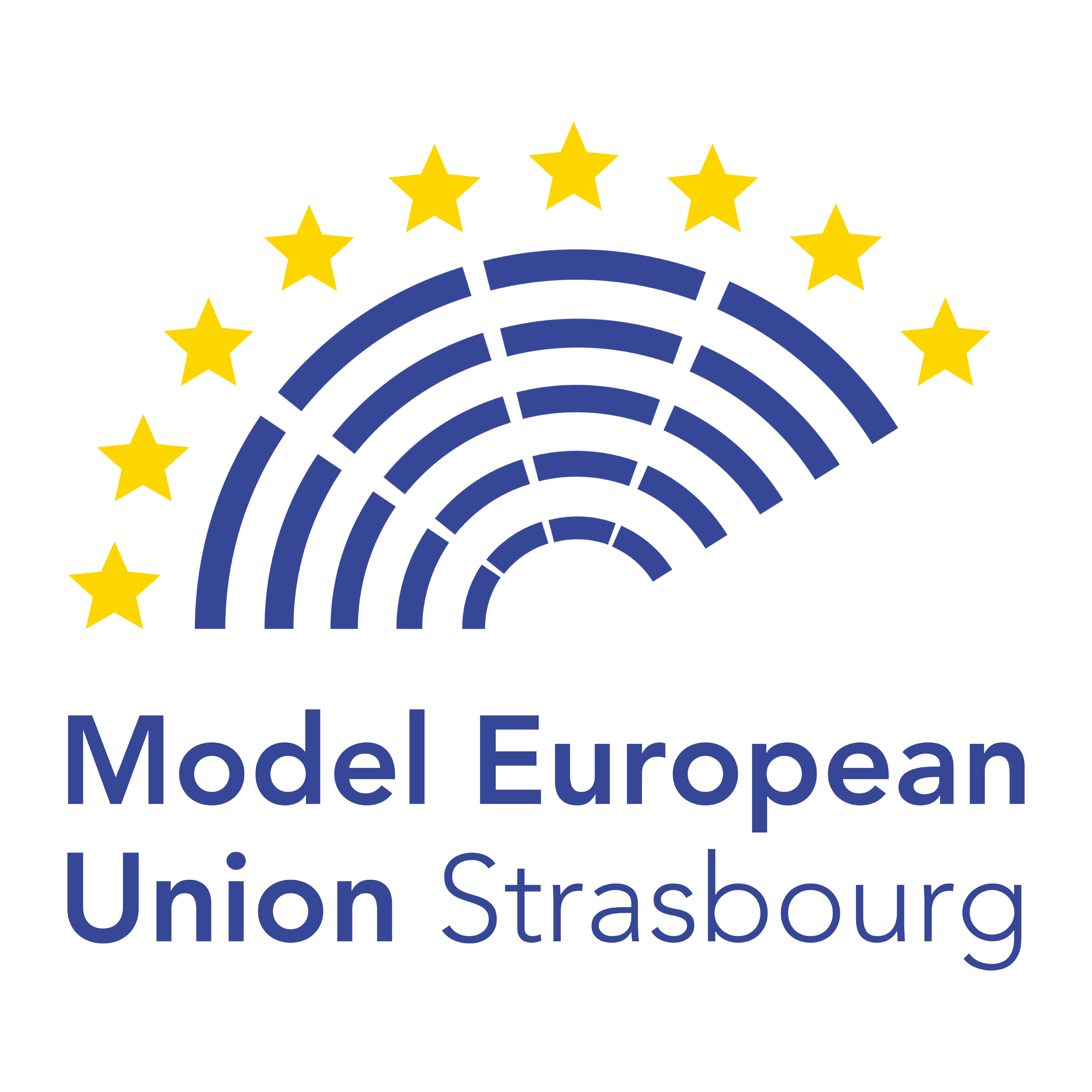
- Type: NGO – Simulation
- Purpose: Education
- Location: Strasbourg, France
- Official language: English
- Director General: Michael Gatt
- Director General: Maddalena Magnante
- Website: meu-strasbourg.org

Model European Union Strasbourg (MEUS) is the original simulation of the European Union's legislative process organised by BETA France. It was initiated in the spring of 2007 by a group of university students and gathers around 180 young people from across Europe in the Seat of the European Parliament in Strasbourg, France annually.

== Conference ==
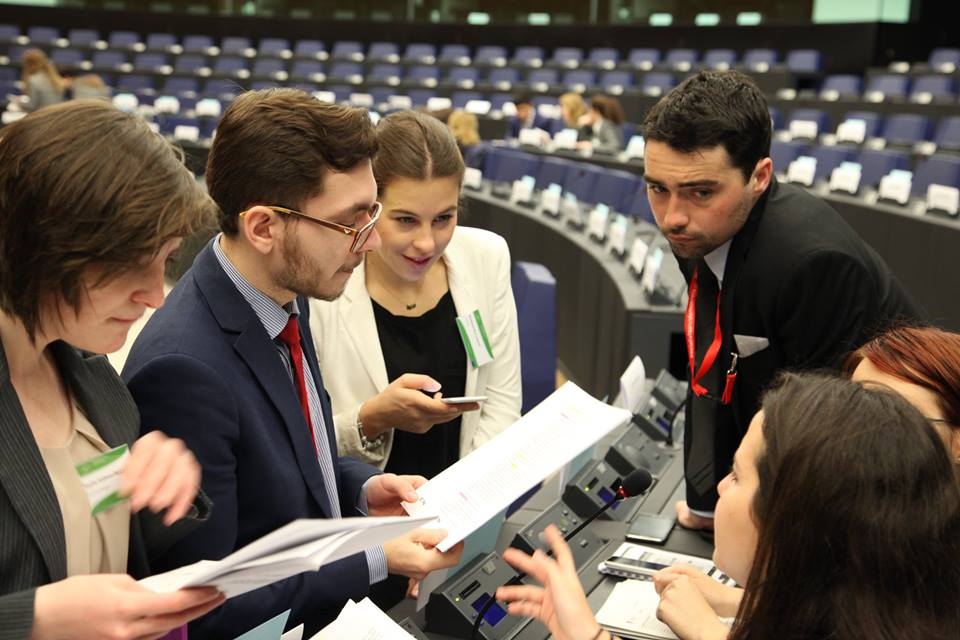

Model European Union Strasbourg is a simulation of European Union Politics and legislative procedures. It usually features two legislative proposals for a Directive and a Regulation, which are selected by the Organising Team on the basis of importance and currency of topics. This year's DGs, Michael and Maddalena, are currently gearing up for MEUS 2026, hoping to build on the success of previous editions.

Participants are divided into Members of Parliament (MEPs), Ministers in the Council of the European Union, Interpreters, Journalists and Lobbyists. MEPs and Ministers discuss the chosen Directive and Regulation proposing amendments according to their interests, aiming at reaching consensus between the two Chambers. This is achieved by following the same Ordinary Legislative Procedure that real MEPs adopt in the exact setting and location of the European Parliament. Meanwhile, Lobbyists try to push forward their agenda and influence the final decision on the two pieces of legislation, while Interpreters ensure accurate and engaging simultaneous interpretation of the whole process in around 10 languages. Everything is carefully documented both visually and verbally by Journalists. Model European Union Strasbourg has its own newspaper, which not only covers the legal procedure, but also provides interviews with stakeholders and background information. The journalist team of each edition chooses the name for the newspaper and the whole team contributes to its daily issue. Additionally, a press conference in which journalists can ask questions to MEPs and Ministers takes place on a daily basis. Not only are these press conferences helpful for journalists, but they also make it easier for all stakeholders to keep up with the development of the negotiations in both Chambers.

=== MEUS activities ===
Model European Union Strasbourg normally takes place in April and lasts around seven days, during which participants simulate the decision-making process of the EU and enjoy a rich social programme. All activities are thoroughly scheduled in advance by the Organising Team. The whole MEUS experience starts with a social event, called "Eurofeast": it is an event where participants as well as organisers bring food and drinks from their home countries and share them with others. Booths are set up for each country or group of countries and music from these countries is also played, aiming at spreading each and every participant's home country's culture. The scheduled activities include educational events, such as the Workshops Day and the panel discussions with experts on the two chosen topics before the simulation kicks off. Participants are also given the chance to discover other international opportunities through the Partners' Fair, where MEUS partner organisations, NGOs and youth organisations explain their activities and encourage MEUS participants to get involved. Networking Night also gives such an opportunity: in MEUS 2019 it took the form of European Elections Night, where participants got to meet with some of the rising stars of European politics. Trips are also organised, including a boat tour of Strasbourg, a reception at the City Hall and a visit to the Hemicycle at the European Parliament. "MEUS: Behind the Scenes" (or "MEU Best Practices", as it was known in 2018) is an event held after the simulation ends. Its purpose is informing those considering joining the MEUS Organising Team about its work. It also represents a good opportunity for those participants who just want to know more about what goes into organising Model European Union Strasbourg. During "MEUS: Behind the Scenes" a series of workshops and presentations are carried out by the current Team, who introduces its work and shows participants what it means to organise a simulation of the European Union decision-making process.

The following was the schedule of MEUS 2019:

Day	Events
1	Arrival in Strasbourg; Strasbourg city quest; "Eurofeast"
2	Workshops day; Panel discussions on the topics; Boat tour of Strasbourg; Social event
3	First day of simulation at the European Parliament; Opening ceremony; Hemicycle visit; Reception at City Hall; Kick-off party
4	Simulation sessions; All-you-can-eat dinner
5	Simulation sessions; Free evening
6	Simulation sessions; Partners' fair; Networking night
7	Last day of simulation sessions; Closing ceremony; Photos; Goodbye party
8	MEUS: Behind the Scenes; Participants' departure

== Organising Team ==
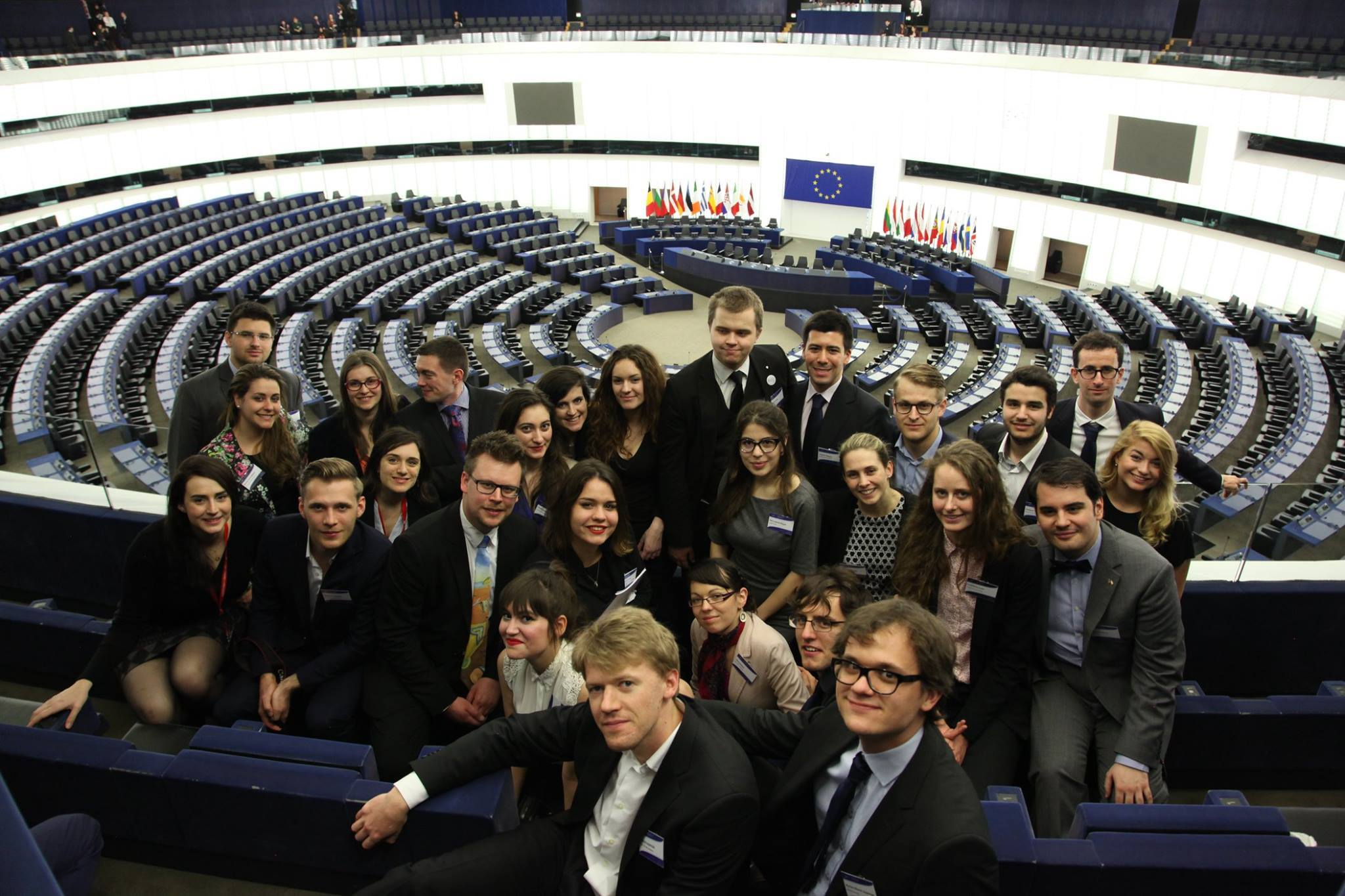
MEUS 2016 Organising Team

Each year the conference is organised by a different group of young people with different nationalities and backgrounds, who voluntarily contribute to the conference, being divided into teams that carry out specific tasks.

The Organising Team is selected primarily by the Director General and the Deputy Director General of each year's MEUS, who are appointed by BETA France, the main organiser of Model European Union Strasbourg since 2018. Until 2017 Model European Union Strasbourg was organised by BETA e.V..

The Organising Team for the 2020 edition consists of 51 volunteers coming from 25 countries.

== History ==
The first conference successfully took place between 4 and 10 March 2007 and was organized by Ines Verspohl, Wouter Koopman, Pascal Kuyten, Beatrix Massig and Anika Stienen with support of the European students forum AEGEE. After the 2008 event, BETA e.V. was officially founded to ensure the organisation of future events. MEU has grown ever since.

The following table shows the details of the past MEUS editions.

	Organisers	No of applications	No of Participants	Countries Present	Topic A	Topic B
2007	AEGEE	n.a	150	n.a	Regulation of a Funding Instrument for the Western Balkans (incl.: Kosovo Listed Among Recipient Countries)	Regulation on the Recognition of "Non-Formal Education"
2008	Informal group of young people	250	100	25	Regulation for Compulsory Licensing of Patents Relating to the Manufacture of Pharmaceutical Products	Directive on the Laws, Regulations and Administrative Provisions Relating to the Advertisement and Sponsorship of Alcoholic Products
2009	BETA e.V.	400	120	26	Act Concerning the Election of the Members of the European Parliament by Direct Universal Suffrage	Regulation on Setting Emission Performance Standards for New Passenger Cars to Reduce CO2 Emissions from Light-Duty Vehicles
2010	BETA e.V.	800	180	27	Regulation on Genetically Modified Food and Feed	Directive on Common Standards and Procedures for Returning Illegally Staying Third-Country Nationals
2011	BETA e.V.	1076	180	27	Directive on the Application of Patient's Rights in Cross-Border Healthcare	Directive on Working Conditions of Temporary Workers
2012	BETA e.V.	998	193	29	Directive on the Use of Passenger Name Record Data for the Prevention, Detection, Investigation and Prosecution of Terrorist Offences and Serious Crime	Regulation establishing a European Agency for the Management of Operational Co-operation at the External Borders
2013	BETA e.V.	750	182	27	Proposal for a Directive of the European Parliament and of the Council on Collective Management of Copyright and Related Rights and Multi-territorial Licensing of Rights in Musical Works for Online Uses in the Internal Market	Simulation of Croatia's EU Membership Accession Negotiations
2014	BETA e.V.	745	173	30	Negotiations towards a European Social Fund Regulation	Negotiating Mandate for a Transatlantic Trade and Investment Partnership (TTIP)
2015	BETA e.V.	527	146	31	The Creation of a European Banking Union	The General Data Protection Regulation
2016	BETA e.V.	485	176	41	Refugee Crisis	Biofuels and Indirect Land Use Change (ILUC)
2017	BETA e.V.	392	167	40	Third Country Nationals' Access to the Internal Market	Countering Terrorism
2018	BETA France	n.a	n.a	n.a	Privacy in Electronic Communications	Work Life Balance
2019	BETA France	823	176	45	Fight against Climate Change	Consumer Protection Law

As European Elections were to be held in May 2019, 2019 MEUS edition featured a third topic: the Annex of the 1976 Electoral Act. It gave participants the opportunity to debate the current European election system and advocate for new ideas, while learning more about European democracy.

== Participation criteria and costs ==
Students and young professionals between the age of 18 and 27 from any country are eligible to apply to take part in Model European Union Strasbourg. They are not required to be from a Member State of the European Union. Participants are selected on the basis of merit and motivation. These criteria are to maintain the project's goal of youth inter-European learning and networking. All applications are done online via the Model European Union Strasbourg.

The cost of participating in Model European Union Strasbourg has been around €150-€250 for many years. Nevertheless, MEUS has a Social Fund to encourage the participation of people from different backgrounds and allow youngsters who would have trouble attending the simulation due to such costs to have the opportunity to take part in MEUS.

== Partners ==
Model European Union Strasbourg partners up with other organisations which – among others – include different universities, student organisations, NGOs, simulations of the United Nations and the EU, but also major youth organisations, such as AEGEE, JEF, AIESEC and Erasmus Student Network (ESN).

Furthermore, the conference was and is supported by high-range EU politicians, such as Jean-Claude Juncker, Martin Schulz, José Manuel Barroso, Guy Verhofstadt, Ulrike Lunacek, Hans-Gert Pöttering and Herman van Rompuy.

== Prizes ==
Model European Union Strasbourg was one of the national winners of the European Charlemagne Youth Prize in 2010 and 2016.

The Model European Union Strasbourg 2015 edition was selected by the European Commission as a success story, because it was judged as closely linked to the aims and objectives of the grants, including policy relevance, impact, transferability, innovation, sustainability and the communication of project results.

== See also ==
- Model United Nations
