= List of international presidential trips made by Bashar al-Assad =

This is a list of presidential trips made by Bashar al-Assad during his presidency, which began with his inauguration on 17 July 2000 and ended with his overthrow on 8 December 2024.

== Summary ==
The number of visits per country where President of Syria Bashar al-Assad traveled are:

- One: Argentina, Armenia, Austria, Azerbaijan, Bahrain, Belarus, Brazil, Bulgaria, Croatia, Cuba, Cyprus, Germany, Greece, Italy, India, Kuwait, Libya, Malaysia, Morocco, Oman, Romania, Sudan, Slovakia, Ukraine, United Kingdom, Vatican City, Venezuela
- Two: Algeria, China, Jordan, Lebanon, Yemen
- Three: Spain, Tunisia, Turkey
- Five: France, United Arab Emirates
- Six: Egypt, Qatar
- Seven: Iran
- Nine: Russia
- Eleven: Saudi Arabia

World map highlighting countries visited by Bashar ak-Assad during his presidency. One visit Two visits Three visits Four visits Five visits Six visits Seven or more visits Syria

== 2000 ==
Country	Locations	Dates	Details
Egypt	Cairo	3 October	Met with President Hosni Mubarak.

== 2001 ==
Country	Locations	Dates	Details
United Arab Emirates	Abu Dhabi	21 January	Met with President Zayed bin Sultan Al Nahyan.
Saudi Arabia		14 February	Met with King Fahd and Crown Prince Abdullah.
Jordan	Amman	27–28 March	Met with King Abdullah II. Attended the 13th Arab League summit.
Tunisia	Tunis	10–11 April	Met with President Zine El Abidine Ben Ali.
Morocco	Rabat	11–12 April	Met with King Mohammed VI.
Spain	Madrid	4 May	Met with King Juan Carlos I and Queen Sofía.
Egypt	Sharm el-Sheikh	16–18 May	Met with President Hosni Mubarak.
France	Paris	25–26 June	Met with President Jacques Chirac.
Germany	Berlin	10–12 July	Met with Chancellor Gerhard Schröder.
Yemen	Sanaa	17 September	Met with President Ali Abdullah Saleh.
Saudi Arabia	Jeddah	18 September	Met with King Fahd and Crown Prince Abdullah.
Egypt	Sharm el-Sheikh	19 September	Met with President Hosni Mubarak.

== 2002 ==
Country	Locations	Dates	Details
Italy		February	Visit.
Egypt		March	Visit.
Lebanon	Beirut	March	Attended the 14th Arab Summit.
Saudi Arabia		August	Visit.
United Kingdom		December	Met with Queen Elizabeth II.
France		December	Visit.
Algeria		December	Visit.

== 2003 ==
Country	Locations	Dates	Details
Malaysia		October	Visit.
Qatar		October	Visit.
Greece		December	State visit.

== 2004 ==
Country	Locations	Dates	Details
Turkey		6 January	Landmark visit.
Tunisia	Tunis	May	Attended the 16th Arab Summit.
China		June	Visit.
Spain	Madrid	June	Official visit. Met with Prime Minister José Luis Rodríguez Zapatero. Discussions were focused on the EU-Syria Association Agreement and the situation in Iraq.
Egypt	Cairo	July	Met with President Hosni Mubarak.
United Arab Emirates		November	Attended the funeral of President Zayed bin Sultan Al Nahyan.

== 2005 ==
Country	Locations	Dates	Details
Russia		January	Visit.
Algeria	Algiers	March	Attended the 17th Arab Summit.
Vatican City	Vatican City	April	Attended the funeral of Pope John Paul II.
Saudi Arabia	Riyadh	August	Attended the funeral of King Fahd.

== 2006 ==
Country	Locations	Dates	Details
Yemen		January	Visit.
Saudi Arabia		March	Visit.
Sudan	Khartoum	March	Attended the 18th Arab Summit.
Egypt	Cairo	June	Visit.

== 2007 ==
Country	Locations	Dates	Details
Qatar		January	Visit.
Iran		February	Visit.
Saudi Arabia	Riyadh	March	Attended the 19th Arab Summit.
Turkey		October	Visit.

== 2008 ==
Country	Locations	Dates	Details
United Arab Emirates		June	Visit.
Kuwait		June	Visit.
India		June	Visit.
France		July	Visit.
Iran		August	Visit.
Russia		August	Visit.

== 2009 ==
Country	Locations	Dates	Details
Qatar		January	Visit.
Jordan		March	Visit.
Qatar	Doha	March	Attended the 21st Arab Summit.
Austria		April	Visit.
Slovakia		April	Visit.
Armenia		June	Visit.
Azerbaijan		July	Official visit.
Iran		August	Visit.
Turkey		September	Visit.
Croatia	Zagreb	28 October	Met with President Stjepan Mesić.
France		November	Visit.

== 2010 ==
Country	Locations	Dates	Details
Saudi Arabia		January	Visit.
Qatar		January	Visit.
Libya	Sirte	March	Attended the 22nd Arab Summit.
Turkey		May	Visit.
Qatar		May	Visit.
Venezuela		June	Visit.
Cuba		June	Visit.
Brazil		June	Visit.
Argentina		July	Visit.
Spain		July	Visit.
Belarus		July	Visit.
Lebanon		July	Visit.
Tunisia		July	Visit.
Iran		October	Visit.
Saudi Arabia		October	Visit.
Cyprus		November	Visit.
Bulgaria		November	Visit.
Romania	Bucharest	10 November	Official visit. Met with President Traian Băsescu.
Ukraine	Kyiv	December	Visit.
France		December	Visit.
Qatar		December	Visit.

== 2015 ==
Country	Locations	Dates	Details
Russia	Moscow	21 October	Unannounced working visit. Met with President Vladimir Putin.

== 2017 ==
Country	Locations	Dates	Details
Russia	Moscow	21 November	Working visit. Met with President Vladimir Putin.

== 2018 ==
Country	Locations	Dates	Details
Russia	Moscow	17 May	Surprise working visit. Met with President Vladimir Putin.

== 2019 ==
Country	Locations	Dates	Details
Iran	Tehran	25 February	First visit to Iran since the Syrian war began. Met with Ali Khamenei.

== 2021 ==
Country	Locations	Dates	Details
Russia	Moscow	14 September	Working visit. Met with President Vladimir Putin.

== 2022 ==
Country	Locations	Dates	Details
United Arab Emirates	Abu Dhabi, Dubai	18 March	Working visit. Met with Mohamed bin Zayed Al Nahyan and Prime Minister Mohammed bin Rashid al-Maktoum.
Iran	Tehran	8 May	Met with Ali Khamenei and Ebrahim Raisi.

== 2023 ==
Country	Locations	Dates	Details
Oman	Muscat	20 February	Working visit. Met with Sultan Haitham bin Tariq.
Russia	Moscow	14–15 March	Working visit. Met with President Vladimir Putin.
United Arab Emirates	Abu Dhabi	18 March	Met with President Mohamed bin Zayed Al Nahyan and Prime Minister Mohammed bin Rashid al-Maktoum.
Saudi Arabia	Jeddah	18–19 May	Attended the 32nd Arab Summit. Met with Prince Mohammed bin Salman.
China	Hangzhou; Beijing	21–26 September	State visit. Attended the 2022 Asian Games. Also met with President Xi Jinping, Premier Li Qiang, and National People's Congress Standing Committee Chairman Zhao Leji.
Saudi Arabia	Riyadh	10–11 November	Attended the 2023 Emergency Arab League Summit. Met with Prince Mohammed bin Salman.

== 2024 ==
Country	Locations	Dates	Details
Bahrain	Manama	16–17 May	Attended the 33rd Arab Summit. Met with King Hamad bin Isa Al Khalifa.
Iran	Tehran	30 May	Working visit. Met with Ali Khamenei and acting President Mohammad Mokhber.
Russia	Moscow	24–25 July	Working visit. Met with President Vladimir Putin.
Saudi Arabia	Riyadh	11 November	Attended the 2024 Arab–Islamic extraordinary summit. Met with Prince Mohammed bin Salman.
Russia	Moscow	28–29 November	Met with President Vladimir Putin.

== See also ==
- List of international presidential trips made by Hafez al-Assad, his father and predecessor
- List of international presidential trips made by Ahmed al-Sharaa, his successor
- Foreign relations of Syria
- Foreign policy of the Bashar al-Assad administration
