= List of international trips made by Muammar Gaddafi =

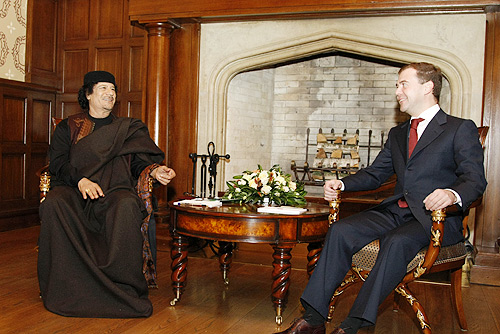
Gaddafi with President Dmitry Medvedev in Moscow, 2008

This is a list of international trips made by Muammar Gaddafi, the de facto leader of Libya, from 1969 to 2011. He was Chairman of the Libyan Revolutionary Command Council from 1969 to 1977 and Brotherly Leader and Guide of the Revolution from 1977 to 2011.

== Summary ==
The number of visits per country where Muammar Gaddafi traveled are:

- One visit: Austria, Belarus, Belgium, Benin, China, Ghana, Greece, Guinea, Guinea-Bissau, Hungary, Jordan, Mali, Mauritania, Niger, North Korea, Pakistan, Portugal, Romania, Russia, Saudi Arabia, Senegal, Spain, Sri Lanka, Togo, the United States, Ukraine, Venezuela, Zambia, and Zimbabwe.
- Two visits: Bulgaria, France, the Gambia, Iraq, Morocco, Mozambique, Nigeria, Poland, Qatar, South Africa, and Uganda.
- Three visits: the Soviet Union, Sudan and Syria.
- Four visits: Chad, Ethiopia, Italy and Malta.
- Five visits: Algeria and Yugoslavia.
- Seven visits: Tunisia.
- Fourteen visits: Egypt.

== 1970s ==
=== 1970 ===
#	Country	Areas visited	Dates	Details
1	Egypt	Cairo	11 June	Working visit. Met with President Gamal Abdel Nasser.
2	Egypt	Cairo	August	Met with President Gamal Abdel Nasser
3	Egypt	Cairo	21–27 September	Attended the Arab League emergency summit.
4	Egypt	Cairo	1 October	Attended the state funeral of Gamal Abdel Nasser.
5	Syria	Damascus	16 November	

=== 1971 ===
#	Country	Areas visited	Dates	Details
6	Tunisia	Tunis	11 February	

=== 1972 ===
#	Country	Areas visited	Dates	Details
7	Sudan		February	
8	Egypt	Cairo	1–4 May	Met with President Anwar Sadat.
9	Tunisia	Tunis	14–15 December	Met with President Habib Bourguiba.

=== 1973 ===
#	Country	Areas visited	Dates	Details
10	Egypt	Cairo	7 February	Met with Egyptian president Anwar Sadat and Syrian president Hafez al-Assad.
11	Algeria	Algiers	5–9 September	Attended the 4th Summit of the Non-Aligned Movement.
12	Yugoslavia	Belgrade, Valjevo and Sarajevo	19–23 November	Working visit. Met with President Josip Broz Tito. Discussed military aid and the Arab-Israeli conflict.
13	France	Paris	23–24 November	Working visit. Met with President Georges Pompidou and Prime Minister Pierre Messmer.
14	Malta		25–26 November	Working visit.

=== 1974 ===
#	Country	Areas visited	Dates	Details
15	Pakistan	Lahore	22–24 February	Attended the 2nd Islamic Summit of the Organisation of Islamic Cooperation.
16	Niger	Niamey	7–11 March	
17	Chad	N'Djamena	11–13 March	Met with President François Tombalbaye.
18	Egypt	Alexandria	17–18 August	Working visit. Met with Egyptian president Anwar Sadat and Emirati president Zayed bin Sultan Al Nahyan.
19	Malta	Valletta	19–23 December	Working visit. Opened the Libyan Arab Cultural Institute in Valletta.

=== 1975 ===
#	Country	Areas visited	Dates	Details
20	Malta		December	

=== 1976 ===
#	Country	Areas visited	Dates	Details
21	Malta		21–25 May	
22	Yugoslavia	Belgrade	June	
23	Sri Lanka	Colombo	16–19 August	Attended the 5th Summit of the Non-Aligned Movement.
24	USSR	Moscow	6–9 December	Working visit. Met with General Secretary Leonid Brezhnev, Premier Alexei Kosygin and Minister of Foreign Affairs Andrei Gromyko.

=== 1977 ===
#	Country	Areas visited	Dates	Details
25	Togo		28 January – 1 February	
26	Yugoslavia	Brijuni	21–25 June	Working visit. Met with President Josip Broz Tito.

=== 1978 ===
#	Country	Areas visited	Dates	Details
27	Algeria	Algiers	February	Attended the Steadfastness and Confrontation Front summit.
28	(People's Republic of Bulgaria) Bulgaria	Sofia	June	
29	Hungary	Budapest	June	
30	Poland	Warsaw	1 July	Working visit. Met with First Secretary Edward Gierek and Chairman of the Council of State Henryk Jabłoński.
31	Iraq	Baghdad	2–5 November	Attended the Arab League emergency summit.

=== 1979 ===
#	Country	Areas visited	Dates	Details
32	Syria	Damascus	23 June	Met with President Hafez al-Assad.
33	Qatar	Doha	July	

== 1980s ==
=== 1981 ===
#	Country	Areas visited	Dates	Details
34	USSR	Moscow	27–29 April	Working visit. Met with General Secretary Leonid Brezhnev.
35	Yugoslavia	Belgrade	29 April–1 May	
36	Ethiopia	Addis Ababa	August	

=== 1982 ===
#	Country	Areas visited	Dates	Details
37	Tunisia		25 January	Working visit. Met with Prime Minister Mohammed Mzali.
38	Austria	Vienna	10–14 March	Working visit.
39	Poland	Warsaw	15 September	Working visit. Met with First Secretary Wojciech Jaruzelski.
40	China		October	Working visit. Met with Paramount Leader Deng Xiaoping. Visited the Great Wall of China.
41	North Korea	Pyongyang	October	Working visit. Met with President Kim Il-sung and signed a ten-year friendship treaty.
42	Yugoslavia		2–6 November	
43	Tunisia		13–18 December	

=== 1983 ===
#	Country	Areas visited	Dates	Details
44	Bulgaria		17–21 January	Working visit. Signed the Bulgarian-Libyan Friendship and Co-operation Treaty.
45	Romania		21–24 January	Working visit. Met with President Nicolae Ceaușescu.
46	Benin		April	
47	Nigeria		25–28 April	

=== 1984 ===
#	Country	Areas visited	Dates	Details
48	Morocco	Oujda	13 August 1984	Met with King Hassan II. Signed the Oujda Treaty.
49	Greece	Elounda	15 November 1984	Met with French president François Mitterrand and Greek prime minister Andreas Papandreou. Discussed a proposed mutual military withdrawal from the Chadian–Libyan War.

=== 1985 ===
#	Country	Areas visited	Dates	Details
50	USSR	Moscow	10 October 1985	Working visit. Met with General Secretary Mikhail Gorbachev.
51	Senegal		December 1985	

=== 1986 ===
#	Country	Areas visited	Dates	Details
52	Zimbabwe	Harare	1–6 September 1986	Attended the 8th Summit of the Non-Aligned Movement.

=== 1988 ===
#	Country	Areas visited	Dates	Details
53	Algeria	Algiers	7–9 June 1988	Attended the Arab League emergency summit.

=== 1989 ===
#	Country	Areas visited	Dates	Details
54	Morocco	Marrakesh	17 February 1989	Signed the founding treaty of the Arab Maghreb Union.
55	Egypt	Mersa Matruh	16 October 1989	Held talks with President Hosni Mubarak and agreed to reestablish Egypt-Libya relations.

== 1990s ==
=== 1990 ===
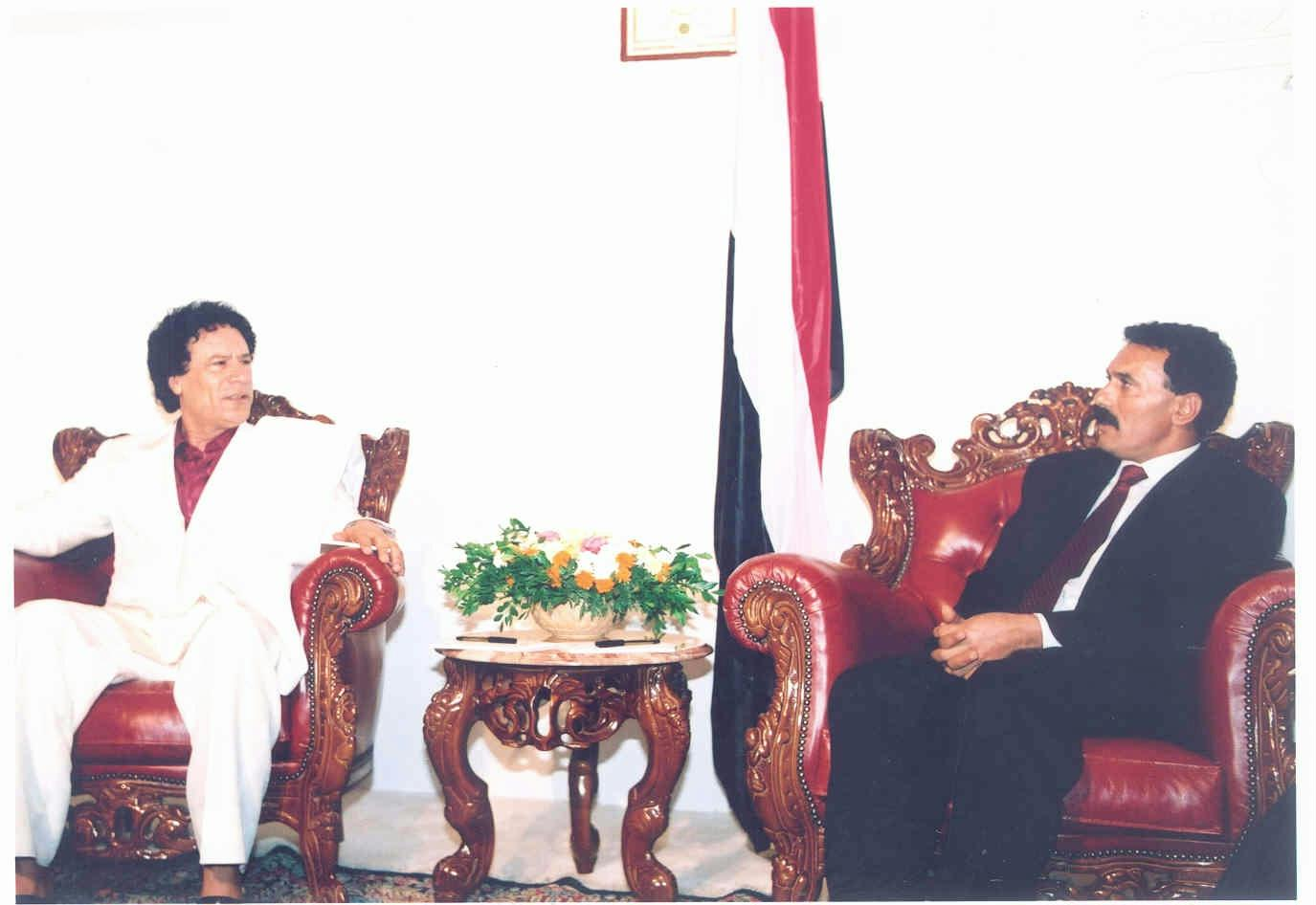
Gaddafi with Yemeni President Ali Abdullah Saleh in Sanaa, Yemen – 22 May 1990

#	Country	Areas visited	Dates	Details
56	Yemen	Sanaa	22 May	Met with President Ali Abdullah Saleh.
57	Iraq	Baghdad	28–30 May	Attended the Arab League summit

=== 1991 ===
#	Country	Areas visited	Dates	Details
58	Egypt	Cairo	29 November	Working visit. Met with President Hosni Mubarak.

=== 1996 ===
#	Country	Areas visited	Dates	Details
59	Egypt	Cairo	25–27 May	Met with President Hosni Mubarak.
60	Egypt	Cairo	22–23 June	Attended the Arab League summit.

=== 1997 ===
#	Country	Areas visited	Dates	Details
61	Nigeria	Abuja and Kano	8–10 May	Met with head of state Sani Abacha. Celebrated the Islamic New Year.

=== 1998 ===
#	Country	Areas visited	Dates	Details
62	Chad	N'Djamena	30 April–5 May	Met with President Idriss Déby.

=== 1999 ===
#	Country	Areas visited	Dates	Details
63	South Africa	Cape Town, Robben Island, Pretoria and Soweto	13–15 June	Met with President Nelson Mandela. Attended the inauguration ceremony of Thabo Mbeki. Visited Robben Island.
64	Algeria	Algiers	12–14 July	Attended the Organization of African Union summit.
65	Chad			

== 2000s ==
=== 2000 ===
#	Country	Areas visited	Dates	Details
66	Saudi Arabia	Riyadh	11–12 October	Met with King Fahd and Crown Prince Abdullah, discussed bilateral Libyan-Saudi Arabian relations and the Israeli-Palestinian conflict.

=== 2001 ===
#	Country	Areas visited	Dates	Details
67	Jordan	Amman	27–28 March	Met with King Abdullah and attended the Arab League summit.
68	Zambia	Lusaka	9–11 July	Attended the final summit of the Organization of African Unity.

=== 2002 ===
#	Country	Areas visited	Dates	Details
69	South Africa	Durban	28 June–10 July	Met with President Thabo Mbeki and attended the founding summit of the African Union.

=== 2003 ===
#	Country	Areas visited	Dates	Details
70	Egypt	Sharm El Sheikh	1 March	Attended the Arab League summit.
71	Tunisia	Tunis	19–23 May	
72	Mozambique	Maputo	2–12 July	Attended the African Union summit.

=== 2004 ===
#	Country	Areas visited	Dates	Details
73	Belgium	Brussels	27–29 April	Working visit. Met with President of the European Commission Romano Prodi and Belgian prime minister Guy Verhofstadt. Visited the headquarters of the European Commission and the Palais d’Egmont.
74	Tunisia	Tunis	22 May	Attended the Arab League summit. Withdrew from the summit following disagreements over its agenda.

=== 2005 ===
#	Country	Areas visited	Dates	Details
75	Algeria	Algiers	22–23 March	Attended the Arab League summit.
76	Mozambique	Maputo	5–7 October	State Visit. Met with President Armando Guebuza.

=== 2006 ===
#	Country	Areas visited	Dates	Details
77	Sudan	Khartoum	28–30 March	Attended the Arab League summit.
78	Mali	Bamako	April	Celebrated Mawlid.
79	The Gambia	Banjul	25 June–2 July	Attended the 7th African Union summit. Mediated talks between Sudanese president Omar al-Bashir and Chadian president Idriss Déby.

=== 2007 ===
#	Country	Areas visited	Dates	Details
80	Ghana	Accra	25 June–6 July	Attended the 9th African Union summit.
81	Portugal	Lisbon	8–9 December	Attended the 2nd European Union–African Union Summit.
82	France	Paris	10–14 December	State visit. Met with President Nicolas Sarkozy.
83	Spain	Madrid	15–18 December	State visit. Met with King Juan Carlos and Prime Minister José Luis Rodríguez Zapatero.

=== 2008 ===
#	Country	Areas visited	Dates	Details
84	Ethiopia	Addis Ababa	25 January–2 February	Attended the African Union summit.
85	Uganda	Kampala	13–17 March	Met with President Yoweri Museveni and attended the Afro-Arab youth festival.
86	Syria	Damascus	28–29 March	Met with President Bashar al-Assad and attended the 20th Arab League summit.
87	Tunisia	Tunis	4–8 August	Met with President Zine El Abidine Ben Ali. Attended the inauguration of the Omar El Mokhtar housing project. Delivered a lecture at Carthage University.
88	Russia	Moscow	31 October–2 November	State visit. Met with Russian president Dmitry Medvedev and Prime Minister Vladimir Putin.
89	Belarus	Minsk	2–4 November	Met with Belarusian president Alexander Lukashenko.
90	Ukraine	Kiev	4–6 November	State visit. Met with Ukrainian president Viktor Yushchenko and Prime Minister Yulia Tymoshenko.

=== 2009 ===
#	Country	Areas visited	Dates	Details
91	Guinea	Conakry	3 January	Working visit. Met with transitional President Moussa Dadis Camara and Prime Minister Kabiné Komara.
92	Ethiopia	Addis Ababa	26 January–3 February	Attended the African Union summit. Elected Chairperson of the African Union.
93	Mauritania	Nouakchott	March	Working visit. Met with President Mohamed Ould Abdel Aziz.
94	Guinea-Bissau	Bissau	12–13 March	Met with acting President Raimundo Pereira.
95	Qatar	Doha	31 March	Met with Sheikh Hamad bin Khalifa Al Thani and attended the 21st Arab League summit.
96	Italy	Rome	10–13 June	State visit. Met with Prime Minister Silvio Berlusconi.
97	Italy	L’Aquila	8–10 July	Met with Prime Minister Silvio Berlusconi, attended the 35th G8 Summit and held a bilateral meeting with British prime minister Gordon Brown.
98	Egypt	Sharm El Sheikh	11–16 July	Attended the 15th Summit of the Non-Aligned Movement.
99	The Gambia	Banjul	21–23 July	Attended the 15th anniversary celebration of the 1994 Gambian coup d'état. Met with President Yahya Jammeh.
100	United States	New York City	22–25 September	First and only official visit to the United States. Addressed the Council on Foreign Relations.
101	United Nations	New York City	23 September	Addressed the sixty-fourth session of the United Nations General Assembly.
102	Venezuela	Isla Margarita	25–29 September	Attended the 2nd Africa-South America Summit. Met with President Hugo Chávez.
103	Italy	Rome	16–18 November	Attended the United Nations World Summit on Food Security.

== 2010s ==
=== 2010 ===
#	Country	Areas visited	Dates	Details
104	Ethiopia	Addis Ababa	25 January–2 February 2010	Attended the 14th African Union summit.
105	Uganda	Kampala	19–27 July 2010	Attended the 15th African Union summit.
106	Italy	Rome	29 August–2 September 2010	Met with Prime Minister Silvio Berlusconi.
107	Sudan	Khartoum	21 December 2010	Met with President Omar al-Bashir.

=== 2011 ===
#	Country	Areas visited	Dates	Details
108	Chad	Ndjamena	11 January 2011	Attended the celebrations of Chad's 50th independence anniversary.
