= Riyadh summit =

Riyadh summit may refer to:

- the 2007 Arab League summit
- the 2017 Riyadh summit during a visit by US President Donald Trump to Saudi Arabia
- the 2020 G20 Riyadh summit
- the 2023 Arab–Islamic extraordinary summit
- the February 2025 United States–Russia summit in Saudi Arabia
