= Saddam Hussein initiative of 12 August 1990 =

On 12 August 1990, Iraqi President Saddam Hussein announced an initiative aimed at resolving all regional conflicts, with particular emphasis on the most longstanding and pressing issues, including the Israeli–Palestinian conflict, the war in Lebanon, the Iran–Iraq border dispute and the recently emerged dispute between Iraq and Kuwait. The proposal was made ten days after Iraqi forces entered Kuwaiti territory and deposed the ruling family, four days after the arrival of the first coalition troops in Saudi Arabia, and two days following the emergency Arab League summit. The initiative did not include an explicit provision for the withdrawal of Iraqi forces from Kuwait. The Al-Aqsa Mosque incident of October 1990 lent additional weight to Saddam Hussein's argument that justice should be applied consistently across all regional issues.

== Reactions ==
In a statement issued on 18 August, the Palestine Liberation Organization expressed its support for the initiative.

In an address to the Knesset Foreign Affairs and Defense Committee, Israeli Prime Minister Yitzhak Shamir stated that Saddam Hussein might seek to transform his dispute with the international community into an Arab confrontation with Israel, adding that Israel was doing everything possible to prevent such a scheme from succeeding.

Syrian Foreign Minister Farouk al-Sharaa stated that the Gulf crisis should not be linked to the Arab-Israeli conflict. He affirmed that only an unconditional Iraqi withdrawal from Kuwait could create the conditions necessary for resolving that crisis and for securing a complete Israeli withdrawal.

The United States rejected the proposal, maintaining that any resolution must begin with Iraq's withdrawal from Kuwait and the implementation of United Nations Security Council resolutions. Saudi Arabia and Egypt rejected the initiative.

Following the Al-Aqsa Mosque incident on 8 October 1990, discussions intensified around the possible linkage between various Middle Eastern conflicts. French President François Mitterrand remarked that, although he did not wish to conflate the issues of Jerusalem and the Gulf crisis, the United Nations was facing two problems that could become interconnected, as the question of justice was being raised in similar terms in both cases. He added, "One cannot seek to uphold justice in one instance while ignoring it in another. Justice is justice." French Foreign Minister Roland Dumas also commented, stating, "There are several powder kegs in the Middle East, and there are connections among them." He went on to say that the Al-Aqsa incident would serve Saddam Hussein’s cause if the international community failed to address Palestinian concerns and the legitimate aspiration of the Palestinian people to have a state in which they could live, while also respecting Israel's security.

== Later developments ==
In a later interview with a Turkish journalist, President Saddam Hussein asserted that Kuwait had been incorporated as Iraq's nineteenth governorate.

In an effort to prevent hostilities before the 15 January deadline, Michel Vauzelle, head of the Foreign Affairs Committee of the French National Assembly (the lower house of Parliament), traveled to Baghdad on 2 January. There, he held talks with Foreign Minister Tariq Aziz and also met with President Saddam Hussein. He returned via Tunisia, where he is believed to have met with Yasser Arafat, Chairman of the Palestine Liberation Organization. A French radio broadcast on 6 January reported Vauzelle as saying that Saddam was "prepared to make concessions if a conference on Palestine were to be held."

In March 1991, it was revealed that France had been willing to consider Iraq's attempt to link its invasion of Kuwait to the Palestinian issue, on the condition that Iraq withdrew from the emirate and released all foreign hostages.
