= Foreign policy of the Bashar al-Assad administration =

Syrian foreign policy from 2000 to 2024

Syrian foreign policy during the presidency of Bashar al-Assad is based on continuity from the Cold War-era policies of his father and predecessor, Hafez al-Assad. Hafez al-Assad was a strong supporter of Soviet Union and aligned Ba'athist Syria closely with the Eastern Bloc. During this period, Syria adopted a strong anti-Zionist posture in the region, based on its military doctrine of gaining "strategic parity" and forming joint Arab initiatives.

After coming to power in 2000, Assad maintained his father's foreign policies such as alliance with Iran, support to Hezbollah and pursuing an anti-Zionist agenda. During the first decade of his rule, Assad focused on integrating Syria into the regional system, by balancing relations with neighbouring countries and preventing the blowback of Iraq War. Assad's military support to Hezbollah and Iran-backed militant groups has been described as the "central component of his security doctrine". Syria is also a prominent ally of Russia and its president Vladimir Putin.

Following its crackdown on protests in 2011, Syria became globally isolated and numerous sanctions were imposed by the European Union, the United States, the Arab League, and others. From the early stages of the conflict in Syria, major Western countries such as the US, France, and the United Kingdom, as well as rival powers in the region allied with the US such as Turkey, Saudi Arabia, Jordan and Qatar have provided political, military, and logistic support to the Syrian opposition and its associated rebel groups in Syria. On the other hand, the Syrian government is politically and militarily supported by Iran, Russia, and Lebanon's Hezbollah. Since September 2015, Russia, at the request of the Assad government, has waged an intensive air campaign against anti-government forces in Syria.

As of 2023, the Syrian civil war has resulted in over 600,000 deaths and millions of forced displacements; triggering the largest refugee crisis in the world. The military activities of Syria, Iran, and Russia during the war have been criticized by the US and its allies, as well as several journalists and human rights organizations.

== Background ==
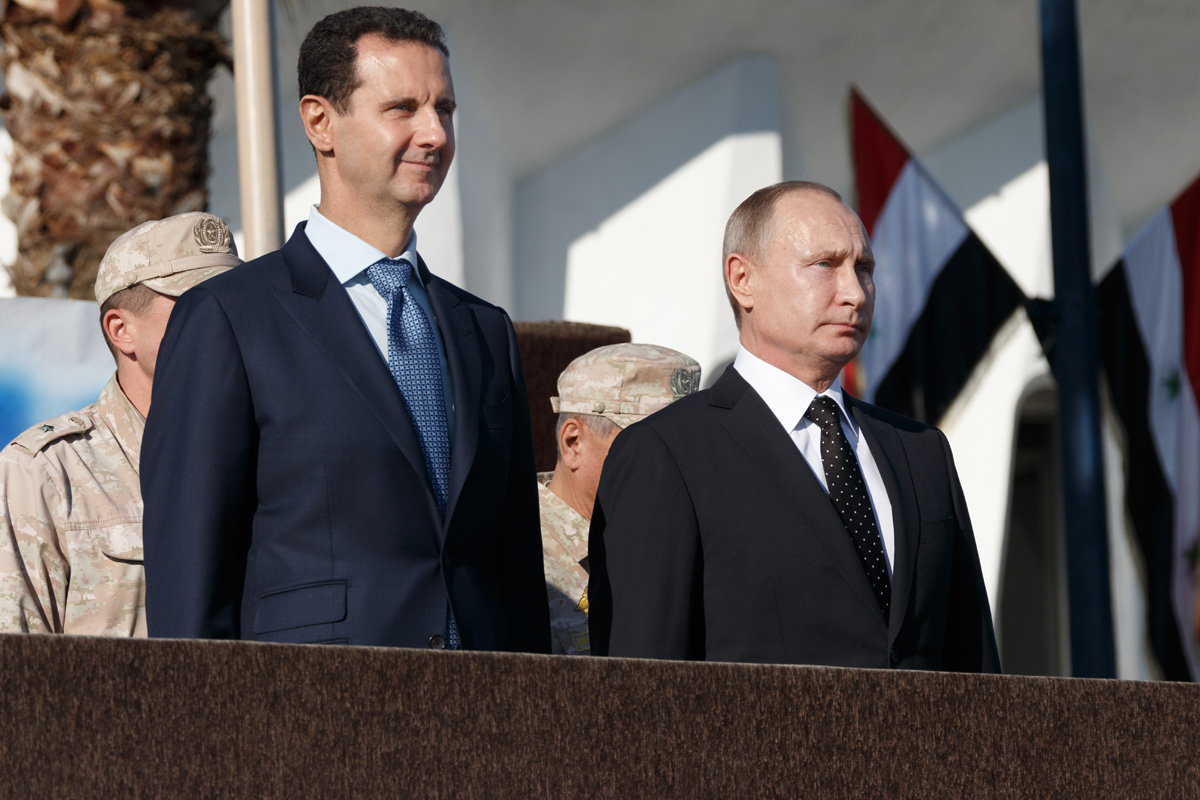
Vladimir Putin and Bashar al-Assad in Russia's Khmeimim Air Base in Latakia, 2017

Major pillars of foreign policy of Ba'athist Syria were formulated during the presidency of Hafez al-Assad, who is revered as al-Muqaddas (Arabic: المقدس, lit. 'the Sanctified') by the Arab Socialist Ba'ath Party. Hafez allied Syria closely to the Eastern Bloc and adopted an anti-Zionist, anti-American strategy in the region by strengthening the Syrian military; which he integrated into the Ba'ath party by packing its officers with Ba'athist loyalists of Alawite background.

In 1976, Hafez al-Assad ordered a military intervention in Lebanon, resulting in the Syrian occupation of the country. He also gave support to Palestinian insurgent organizations and developed an alliance with Iran after 1979. Syrian strategy during this period was based on the doctrine of "strategic parity" ("al-tawazun al-istratiji"), which involved the achievement of pan-Arab co-operation and strengthening of its military capabilities with Soviet support. After the fall of Soviet Union, Syrian government lost its primary military supplier and geo-political ally, leading to its isolation in the international arena.

Following his succession in 2000, Assad preserved many of his father's hardline foreign policies such as alliance with Iran, support to Hezbollah in Lebanon and pursuing an anti-Western agenda. Although he made attempts to integrate Syria into the regional system, events such as the assassination of Rafic Hariri and Lebanese Cedar Revolution resulted in international backlash against his government, leading to Syrian military withdrawal from Lebanon in 2005. Assad's military support to Hezbollah and Iran-backed proxies in Lebanon became the "central component of his security doctrine" and the Syrian government backed Hezbollah in the 2006 Lebanon War. Syria also revived its alliance with Soviet Union's successor state Russia and Assad has formed close alliance with Vladimir Putin, who regularly provided cover for Assad in the UN Security Council.

== Relations with countries ==
=== China ===
In 2004, Assad visited China, the first visit by a Syrian head of state since the establishment of diplomatic relations. Syria participates in the China-Arab States Cooperation Forum (CASCF), which is the primary multilateral cooperation body between China and the Arab world. Although the Arab states primarily coordinate in the CASCF through the Arab League, Syria coordinated individually between 2011 and 2023 due to the suspension of its Arab League membership. In 2022, Syria joined China's Belt and Road Initiative. In May 2023, Syria participated in a CASCF summit in Chengdu as member of Arab League for the first time since 2011.

China views counter-terrorism as a major concern to be addressed in the context of the Syrian civil war. China views some Syrian rebel groups, such as the Turkistan Islamic Party (TIP), as terrorist organizations, attributing the uptick in terror in China as partially due to the TIP, particularly via its ties to Uyghurs in China's Xinjiang province. Syria has cooperated with China regarding the issue of Uyghur militants joining Syrian rebel groups fighting the Assad government, with some sources indicating as many as 5,000 Uyghurs from Xinjiang having traveled to Syria in recent years. China has also allegedly increased direct military links to Syria's government, although more discreetly than Russia has done. Although China claims it has no military presence in Syria, there were reports of military cooperation in 2016, 2017, and 2018.

In its position as a permanent member of the UN Security Council, China vetoed ten resolutions regarding Syria between 2010 and 2020 Syria was one of 53 countries that backed the Hong Kong national security law at the United Nations in June 2020. In September 2023, Assad made a diplomatic visit to China and met with General Secretary of the Chinese Communist Party Xi Jinping in Hangzhou, prior to the beginning of 19th Asian Games, where China and Syria jointly announced the establishment of a strategic partnership.

=== Egypt ===
During the Arab Spring, Syrian state media focused primarily upon Hosni Mubarak of Egypt, using the uprising against Mubarak to "demonize the pro-US axis in the region." According to political scientist Larbi Sadiki, this tactic inadvertently "facilitated the spread of chants and phrases" that called for Assad's ouster.

Following the election of Muslim Brotherhood politician Mohamed Morsi as the next Egyptian president, relations became extremely strained. The Muslim Brotherhood is a banned organization and its membership is a capital offence in Syria. Egypt severed all relations with Syria in June 2013. Diplomatic relations were restored and the embassies were reopened after the Morsi government was deposed weeks later by General Abdel Fattah el-Sisi. In July 2013, the two countries agreed to reopen the Egyptian consulate in Damascus and the Syrian consulate in Cairo.

Although Egypt has not been vocal in support for any sides of Syria's ongoing civil war, Abdel Fattah el-Sisi said in 2016 that his nation's priority is "supporting national armies", which he said included the Syrian Armed Forces. He also said regarding Egypt's stance in the conflict: "Our stance in Egypt is to respect the will of the Syrian people, and that a political solution to the Syrian crisis is the most suitable way, and to seriously deal with terrorist groups and disarm them". In late-November 2016, some Arab media outlets reported Egyptian pilots arrived in mid-November to Syria to help the Syrian government in its fight against the Islamic State and al-Nusra Front. In response, the Egyptian government officially denied having a military presence in Syria.

In February 2017, Egypt's Foreign Ministry spokesperson, Ahmed Abu Zeid, said that Egyptian foreign minister Sameh Shoukry, "during his meeting with UN Special Envoy to Syria, Staffan de Mistura, on Saturday confirmed Egypt's rejection of any military intervention that would violate Syrian sovereignty and undermine opportunities of the standing political solutions."

Egypt has also expressed great interest in rebuilding postwar Syria, with many Egyptian companies and businessmen discussing investment opportunities in Syria as well as participation in the reconstruction effort. Tarik al-Nabrawi, president of Egypt's Engineers Syndicate said that 2018 will witness a "boom and influential role for Egyptian construction companies in Syria and to open the door for other companies — in the electricity, building material, steel, aluminum, ceramics and sanitary material fields among others — to work in the Syrian market and participate in rebuilding cities and facilities that the war has destroyed." On 25 February 2018, Syrian state news reported that an Egyptian delegation composed of "members of the Islamic and Arab Assembly for supporting Resistance and Future Pioneers movement as well as a number of figures", including Jamal Zahran and Farouk Hassan, visited the Syrian consulate in Cairo to express solidarity with the Syrian government.

=== France ===
Assad condemned the November 2015 Paris attacks, but accused France of contributing to the spread of terrorism through its support for the Syrian opposition, and rejected sharing intelligence on terrorist threats with French authorities unless France altered its foreign policy on Syria.

=== Iran ===
Syria and Iran are historic and strategic allies, with Syria being regarded as Iran's "closest ally". The relationship between the Iranian and Syrian governments has sometimes been described as an Axis of Resistance. Historically, the two countries shared a common animosity towards the Iraqi Ba'ath Party and Saddam Hussein, with Syria providing military aid to Iran during the Iran–Iraq War. After Hafez al-Assad's death in 2000, Bashar al-Assad continued the relationship by supporting Hezbollah and various Iranian proxies; with the alliance being described as "the central component of his security doctrine".

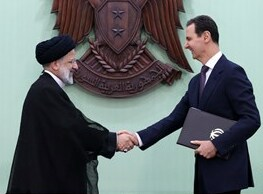
Iranian president Ebrahim Raisi alongside Assad in Damascus, May 2023

Following the outbreak of Syrian revolution in 2011, Iran began politically and militarily aiding the Assad government. The Guardian reported in May 2011 that the Iranian Irgc had increased its "level of technical support and personnel support" to strengthen Syrian military's "ability to deal with protesters". Since the beginning of the insurgency in Syria, Iran has provided training, technical support, and combat troops to the Assad government. Estimates of the number of Iranian personnel in Syria range from hundreds to tens of thousands. Lebanese Hezbollah fighters, backed by Iran's government, have taken direct combat roles since 2012. From the summer of 2013, Iran and Hezbollah provided important battlefield support to Syria, allowing it to make advances against Syrian rebels. As of 2023, Iran maintains 55 military bases in Syria and 515 other military points, the majority in Aleppo and Deir Ezzor governorates and the Damascus suburbs; these are 70% of the foreign military sites in the country.

=== Iraq ===
Syria was a prominent adversary of Ba'athist Iraq during the Cold War. Syria supported Iran in the Iran–Iraq War and joined the American-led coalition against Iraq during the Gulf War. However by 1997, Syrian president Hafez al-Assad began reestablishing relations with Iraqi president Saddam Hussein. The ascendance of Bashar in 2000 boosted this process, and Syria ignored the sanctions against Iraq, helping Iraq to illegally import oil.

Bashar al-Assad opposed the American-led invasion of Iraq in 2003. He sheltered Iraqi Ba'athists and allowed volunteers through Syria to fight the Americans. Syrian pressure for reviewing the de-Ba'athification policy and support for insurgents was despised by the new Iraqi government. As a result, the American-installed government in Iraq suspended oil supplies to Syria. In 2004, The U.S. commander of the coalition forces in Iraq, George W. Casey Jr., accused Syria of hosting Iraqi insurgent leaders who were co-ordinating the anti-American insurgency from their bases in Syria.

Izzat Ibrahim al-Douri, former Vice Chairman of the Revolutionary Command Council of Ba'athist Iraq, had close relations with Ba'athist Syria. Despite the historical differences between the two Ba'ath factions, al-Douri had reportedly urged Saddam to open oil pipelines with Syria, building a financial relationship with the Assad family. After the American invasion of Iraq in 2003, al-Douri reportedly fled to Damascus, from where he organized anti-American militant groups and co-ordinated major combat operations during the Iraqi insurgency. In 2009, General David Petraeus, who was at the time heading the U.S. Central Command, stated that al-Douri was residing in Syria.

In 2006, Syria recognized the post-invasion Iraqi government and resumed ties. However relations still remained poor until 2011, when American troops withdrew from Iraq and the Syrian revolution erupted, during which hundreds of thousands of protestors took to the streets; demanding the overthrowal of Assad regime. Both governments alongside Iran formed a tripartite regional alliance as both Iran and Maliki government in Iraq were critical of the potential rise of Saudi influence in Syria, a Sunni-majority country. Unlike most of the Arab League countries, Iraq rejected calls for al-Assad to step down.

=== Lebanon ===
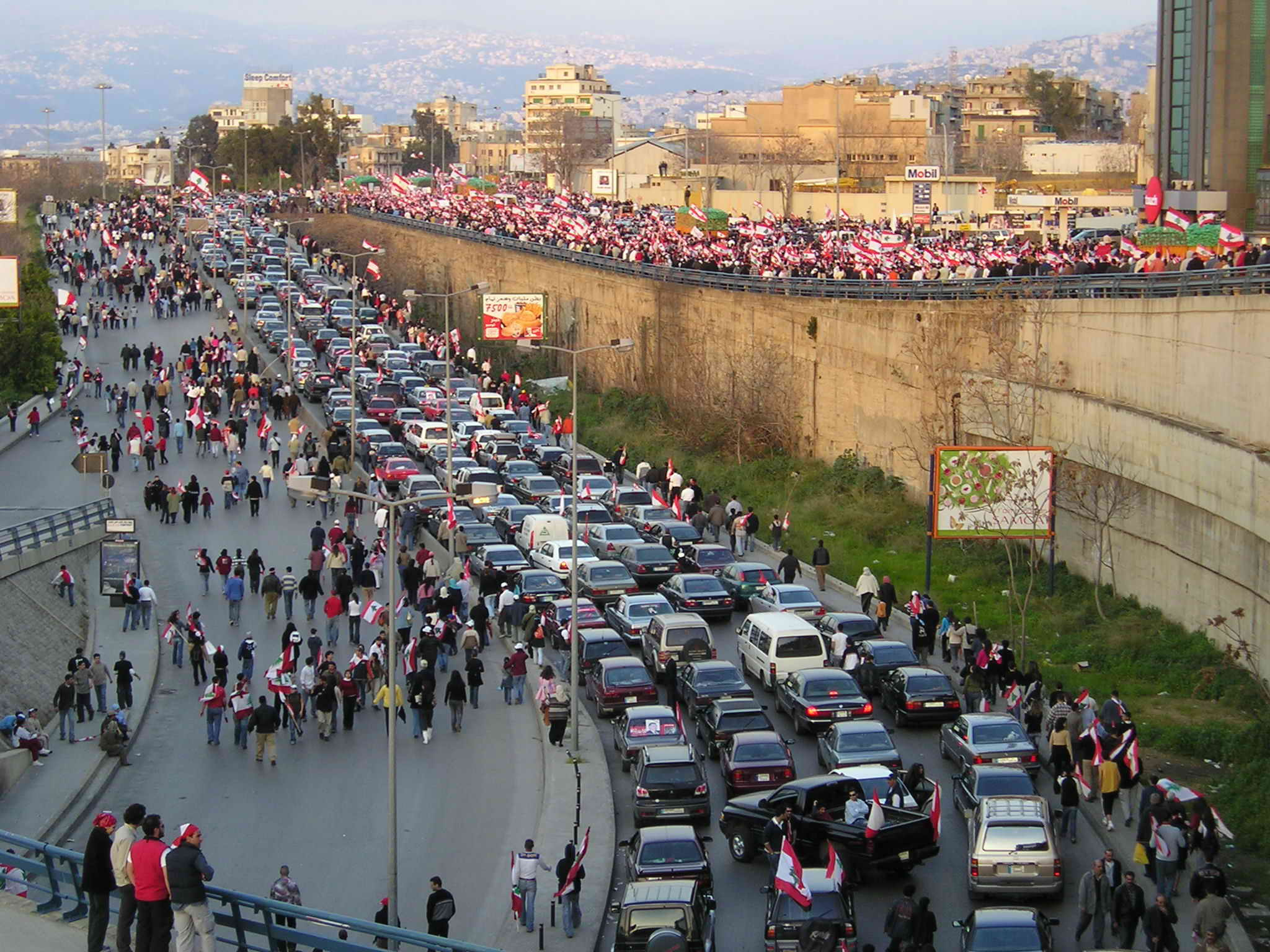
Protesters take to the streets during Lebanon's "Independence Intifada", also known as the Cedar Revolution, following the killing of Rafic Hariri

During his early years, Assad attempted to deepen Syria's control over Lebanese politics by various means. In 2004, he sought the extension of the Presidency of his ally Emile Lahoud, triggering a political crisis. Lebanese Prime Minister Rafic Hariri who opposed Assad's plans was assassinated in 14 March 2005, triggering international backlash. Syrian intelligence was widely blamed for orchestrating the killing of Hariri.

On 5 March 2005, Assad announced that Syrian forces would begin its withdrawal from Lebanon in his address to the Syrian parliament. Syria completed its full withdrawal from Lebanon on 30 April 2005. Assad argued that Syria's gradual withdrawal of troops from Lebanon was a result of the assassination of Lebanese Prime Minister Rafic Hariri. According to testimony submitted to the Special Tribunal for Lebanon, when talking to Rafic Hariri at the Presidential Palace in Damascus in August 2004, Assad allegedly said to him, "I will break Lebanon over your [Hariri's] head and over Walid Jumblatt's head" if Émile Lahoud was not allowed to remain in office despite Hariri's objections; that incident was thought to be linked to Hariri's subsequent assassination. In early 2015, journalist and ad hoc Lebanese-Syrian intermediary Ali Hamade stated before the Special Tribunal for Lebanon that Rafic Hariri's attempts to reduce tensions with Syria were considered a "mockery" by Assad.

Assad's position was considered by some to have been weakened by the withdrawal of Syrian troops from Lebanon following the Cedar Revolution in 2005. There has also been pressure from the U.S. concerning claims that Syria is linked to terrorist networks, exacerbated by Syrian condemnation of the assassination of Hezbollah military leader, Imad Mughniyah, in Damascus in 2008. Interior Minister Bassam Abdul-Majeed stated that "Syria, which condemns this cowardly terrorist act, expresses condolences to the martyr family and to the Lebanese people."

In May 2015, Lebanese politician Michel Samaha was sentenced to 4 1/2 years in jail for his role in a terrorist bomb plot that he claimed Assad was aware of.

=== North Korea ===
North Korea is alleged to have aided Syria in developing and enhancing a ballistic missiles programme. They also reportedly helped Syria develop a suspected nuclear reactor in the Deir ez-Zor Governorate. U.S. officials claimed the reactor was probably "not intended for peaceful purposes", but American senior intelligence officials doubted it was meant for the production of nuclear weapons. The supposed nuclear reactor was destroyed by the Israeli Air Force in 2007 during Operation Orchard. Following the airstrike, Syria wrote a letter to Secretary-General of the UN Ban Ki-moon calling the incursion a "breach of airspace of the Syrian Arab Republic" and "not the first time Israel has violated" Syrian airspace.

While hosting an 8 March 2015 delegation from North Korea led by North Korean Vice Minister of Foreign Affairs Sin Hong Chol, Assad stated that Syria and North Korea were being "targeted" because they are "among those few countries which enjoy real independence".

Asaad Al-Zoubi, head of the Syrian opposition's High Negotiations Committee delegation, accused North Korea of having sent army units to fight on behalf of Assad during the Syrian civil war.

=== Russia ===
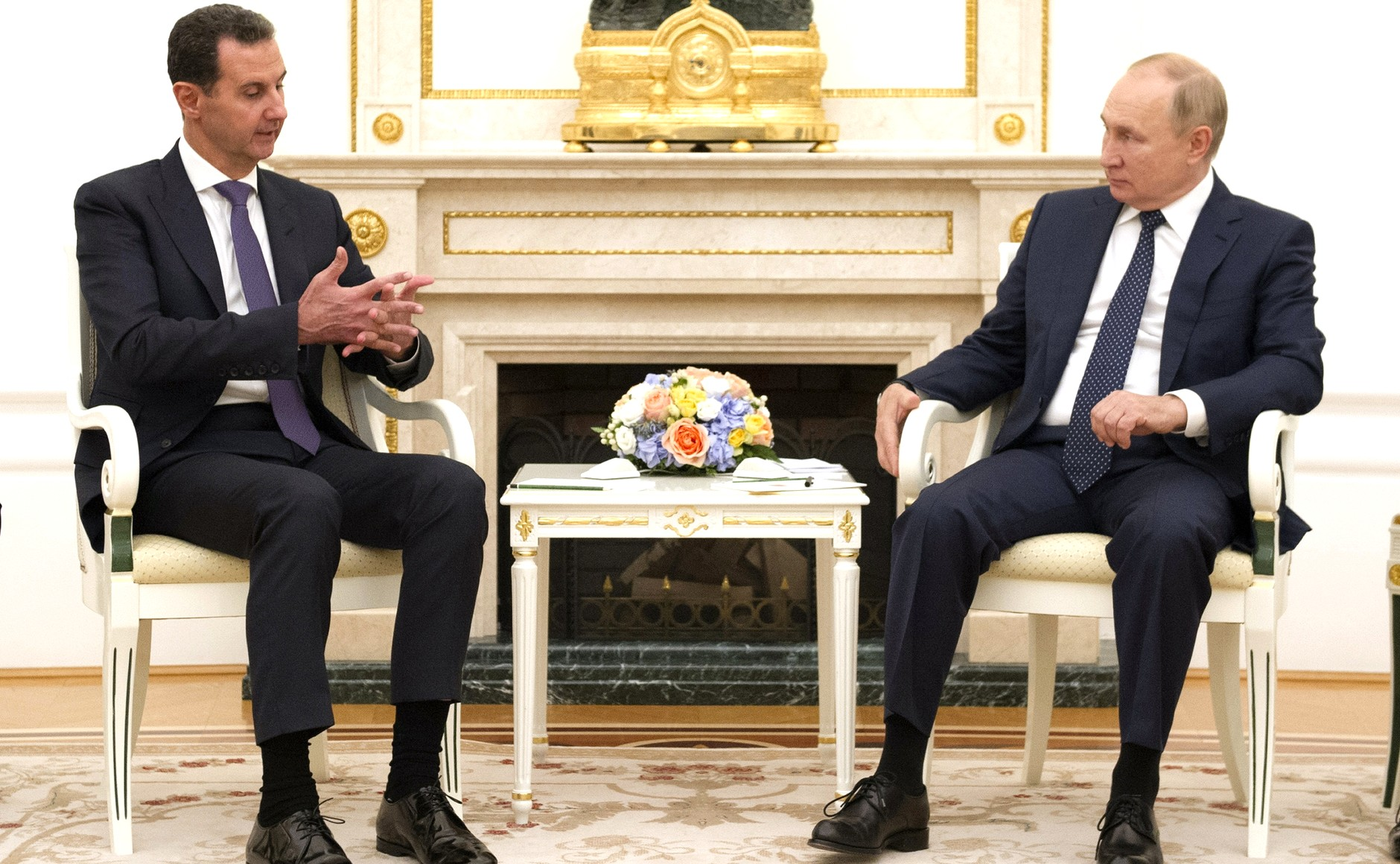
Vladimir Putin alongside Assad, September 2021

Assad also revived his government's strategic alliance with Soviet Union's successor state Russia, with firm backing from Vladimir Putin, who regularly provides cover for Assad in the UN Security Council.

In September 2015, Russia, at the invitation of the Assad government, launched its military intervention in the Syrian civil war due to "the extensive support that foreign states were providing to the Syrian opposition," and as well as to prevent the collapse of Syrian government.

According to Amnesty International, "Russian and Syrian government forces appear to have deliberately and systematically targeted hospitals and other medical facilities." Academic political scientist Laura Neack wrote that "the Assad regime and its Russian ally used scorched-earth tactics of siege and bombardment to clear opposition-held cities and neighborhoods." According to Anna Borshchevskaya, a senior fellow at The Washington Institute, "Moscow’s air campaign ran in tandem with that of the Syrian regime in terms of terrorizing and demoralizing the general population and anti-Assad opposition."

Assad further solidified his regime's alliance with Vladimir Putin by granting Russia permanent access to its Soviet-era naval base in Tartus, the only major Russian naval base in the Mediterranean. During his visit to Moscow in March 2023, Assad officially declared his support of Russian military programs that might involve the establishment of additional military bases and deployment of more Russian troops in Syria. Assad also maintained his backing of Russian invasion of Ukraine, describing Ukrainian regions captured by Russia as "historically Russian territories".

=== Saudi Arabia ===
Four months after Assad succeeded his father as Syrian president, he visited Saudi Arabia in October 2000 and met King Fahd, however the 2005 assassination of Lebanese Prime Minister Rafic Hariri, an ally of Saudi Arabia, adversely affected relations. The Israel-Lebanon war in 2006 further damaged relations due to Syria's overt support to Hezbollah.

In a start of rapprochement between the two countries, Saudi Arabia appointed an ambassador to Syria, Abdullah Al Eifan, on 25 August 2009. Assad visited Riyadh in September 2009, and in October, King Abdullah visited Assad in Damascus. Syria appointed a new ambassador, Mahdi Dakhlallah, to Saudi Arabia the same month, restoring diplomatic relations. By January 2010, Assad had visited Saudi Arabia three times.

The Syrian civil war, which began in 2011, damaged relations between the two countries, due to Saudi Arabia sending funds and weapons to antigovernment rebel forces. King Abdullah was the first Arab leader to condemn the Assad government in August 2011. As a result, Saudi Arabia withdrew its delegation from the Arab League's peacekeeping mission in Syria on 22 January 2012 and closed its embassy in Damascus in February, expelling the Syrian ambassador.

Saudi Arabia was involved in the CIA–led Timber Sycamore covert operation to train and arm Syrian rebels seeking to overthrow the Syrian government. Since the summer of 2013, Saudi Arabia has emerged as the main group to finance and arm the rebels. A classified US State Department cable signed by Secretary of State Hillary Clinton reported that Saudi donors were a major support for Sunni militant forces globally, and some American officials worried that the Syrian rebels being supported had ties to Al Qaeda. In October 2014, U.S. Vice President Joe Biden stated that Turkey, Saudi Arabia and the United Arab Emirates had "poured hundreds of millions of dollars and tens of thousands of tons of weapons into anyone who would fight against Al-Assad, except that the people who were being supplied were al-Nusra Front, and al Qaeda, and the extremist elements of jihadis coming from other parts of the world." In 2015, Assad's main regional opponents, Qatar, Saudi Arabia and Turkey, were openly backing the Army of Conquest, an umbrella rebel group that reportedly included the al-Qaeda linked al-Nusra Front and another Salafi coalition known as Ahrar al-Sham. In a February 2015 interview with BBC's Jeremy Bowen, Assad asserted that ISIL and al-Qaeda's extremist ideology is derived from Wahhabism, a movement within Sunni Islam, that is globally propagated by the Saudi monarchical government.

In August 2017, the Syrian opposition was informed by the Saudi foreign minister that the Kingdom was disengaging from them. Subsequently, Saudi Arabia has taken a more conciliatory stance towards the Syrian government. On 9 May 2023, Saudi Arabia decided to resume work of its diplomatic mission in Syria, which had been suspended since November 2011. On the same day, Syria has decided to resume the work of its diplomatic mission in Saudi Arabia. On 10 May 2023, Syrian state media reported that Saudi King Salman bin Abdulaziz had invited Assad to the 2023 Arab League summit in Jeddah on 19 May. On the sidelines of the summit, Assad met with Crown Prince Mohammed bin Salman, and they discussed improving bilateral relations and developments in the Arab arena.

=== Turkey ===
Historically, Turkey has been described as a "bitter foe" of Syria, however initially under the presidency of Bashar al-Assad, relations between Syria and Turkey significantly improved. The first ever visit to Turkey by a Syrian head of state was made by Assad to Ankara in January 2004, and in late 2004, Turkish Prime Minister Recep Tayyip Erdoğan flew to Damascus to sign a free trade agreement with Syria. In 2008, Turkey played a mediating role between Syria and Israel in an attempt to solve their dispute over control of the Golan Heights, but these talks were abandoned after four rounds, which included a visit by Assad to Erdoğan in Bodrum, Turkey in August 2008. In September 2009, Syria and Turkey formed a joint "senior strategic cooperation council." The following month, the two governments signed an agreement to remove cross-border visa restrictions and pledged to build "a common future."

Since the start of the Syrian civil war, relations greatly deteriorated between the two nations; with Turkey's declared intent to "cultivate a favorable relationship with whatever government would take the place of Assad." Turkey trained defectors of the Syrian Army on its territory, and a group of those trained announced the birth of the Free Syrian Army (FSA), under the supervision of Turkish intelligence. Beginning in 2012, Turkey, in coordination with the US Central Intelligence Agency (CIA), Saudi Arabia, and Qatar sent military and logistic support to Syrian rebels seeking to topple the Syrian government. Turkey's involvement in the Syrian civil war gradually evolved into border clashes in 2012, and direct military interventions in 2016–17, in 2018, in 2019, 2020, and in 2022, resulting in the Turkish occupation of northern Syria since August 2016.

=== United Kingdom ===
In October 2001, British Prime Minister Tony Blair made a state visit to Syria, hosting a joint press conference with Assad. During the conference, Assad condemned the recent United States invasion of Afghanistan, which the United Kingdom had participated in, stating that "[w]e cannot accept what we see every day on our television screens - the killing of innocent civilians. There are hundreds dying every day." Assad also praised Palestinian militant groups as "freedom fighters" and criticised Israel and the Western world during the conference. British officials subsequently described Assad's political views as being more conciliatory in private, claiming that he criticized the September 11 attacks and accepted the legitimacy of the State of Israel.

In 2003, the British Syrian Society, an association set up to promote Syria–United Kingdom relations, was established in London by Assad's father-in-law Fawaz Akhras.

=== United States ===
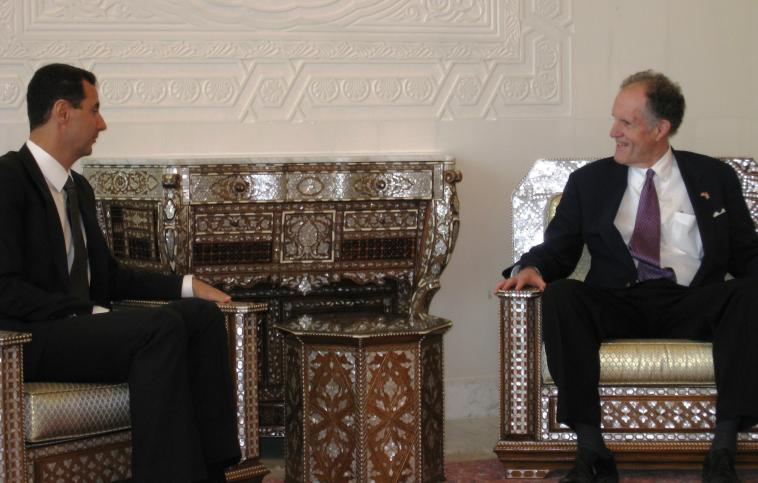
Assad meets with U.S. Senator Ted Kaufman in 2009

The United States added Syria to its first list of "State Sponsors of Terrorism" in 1979, over its funding of Palestinian and other insurgent factions in the region. Syria is the only country from the original 1979 list to remain continuously on the list to the present day, in large part due to its support to Hezbollah. During the first decade of his rule, Assad sought the removal of Syria from the list by improving ties with the US and Western countries in general. Initially, Assad co-operated with the Bush administration's "war on terror" efforts, and the Syrian intelligence shared information with the CIA. However, Syria changed tune following the invasion of Iraq.

Assad met with US scientists and policy leaders during a science diplomacy visit in 2009, and he expressed interest in building research universities and using science and technology to promote innovation and economic growth.

In response to Executive Order 13769 which mandated refugees from Syria be indefinitely suspended from being able to resettle in the US, Assad appeared to defend the measure, stating "It's against the terrorists that would infiltrate some of the immigrants to the West... I think the aim of Trump is to prevent those people from coming," adding that it was "not against the Syrian people".

== Arab–Israeli conflict ==
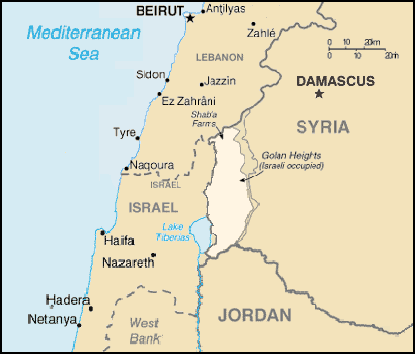
Golan Heights has been occupied and administered as part of Israel since 1967.

The U.S., the EU, the March 14 Alliance, and France accuse Assad of providing support to militant groups active against Israel and opposition political groups. The latter category would include most political parties other than Hezbollah, Hamas, and the Islamic Jihad Movement in Palestine.

In a speech about the 2006 Lebanon War in August 2006, Assad said that Hezbollah had "hoisted the banner of victory", hailing its actions as a "successful resistance." In April 2008, Assad told a Qatari newspaper that Syria and Israel had been discussing a peace treaty for a year. This was confirmed in May 2008, by a spokesman for Israeli Prime Minister Ehud Olmert. As well as the treaty, the future of the Golan Heights was being discussed. Assad was quoted in The Guardian as telling the Qatari paper:

... there would be no direct negotiations with Israel until a new U.S. president takes office. The U.S. was the only party qualified to sponsor any direct talks, [Assad] told the paper, but added that the Bush administration "does not have the vision or will for the peace process. It does not have anything."

According to leaked American cables, Assad called Hamas an "uninvited guest" and said "If you want me to be effective and active, I have to have a relationship with all parties. Hamas is Muslim Brotherhood, but we have to deal with the reality of their presence," comparing Hamas to the Syrian Muslim Brotherhood which was crushed by his father, Hafez al-Assad. He also said Hamas would disappear if peace was brought to the Middle East. However in 2022, Hamas and Assad reconciled and resumed ties.

In his interviews, Assad has indicated that the peace treaty that he envisions may not be the same as Camp David Accords, where there is a legal border crossing and open trade. In a 2006 interview with Charlie Rose, Assad said: "There is a big difference between talking about a peace treaty and peace. A peace treaty is like a permanent ceasefire. There's no war, maybe you have an embassy, but you actually won't have trade, you won't have normal relations because people will not be sympathetic to this relation as long as they are sympathetic with the Palestinians: half a million who live in Syria and half a million in Lebanon and another few millions in other Arab countries." During the visit of Pope John Paul II to Syria in 2001, Assad requested an apology to Muslims for the Crusades and criticised Israeli treatment of Palestinians, stating that "territories in Lebanon, the Golan and Palestine have been occupied by those who killed the principle of equality when they claimed that God created a people distinguished above all other peoples". He also compared the suffering of Palestinians at the hands of the Israelis to the suffering endured by Jesus in Judea, and said that "they tried to kill the principles of all religions with the same mentality in which they betrayed Jesus Christ and the same way they tried to betray and kill the Prophet Muhammad". Responding to accusations that his comment was antisemitic, Assad said that "We in Syria reject the term antisemitism. ... Semites are a race and [Syrians] not only belong to this race, but are its core. Judaism, on the other hand, is a religion which can be attributed to all races." He also stated that "I was talking about Israelis, not Jews. ... When I say Israel carries out killings, it's the reality: Israel tortures Palestinians. I didn't speak about Jews," and criticised Western media outlets for misinterpreting his comments.

Outlining his objectives in a 2009 interview to Al-Khaleej newspaper, Assad stated that "peace agreement" is simply "a piece of paper you sign. This does not mean trade and normal relations, or borders, or otherwise." Furthermore, he asserted that returning Golan Heights to Syria was a pre-condition to entering any peace deal. In an interview given to Italian newspaper La Repubblica in May 2010, Assad described the proposed "peace treaty" as a "truce", rather than a comprehensive peace, so long as the Palestinian crisis remained unsettled. In February 2011, Assad backed an initiative to restore ten synagogues in Syria, which had a Jewish community numbering 30,000 in 1947, but only 200 Jews by 2011.

== Allegations of state-sponsored terrorism ==
According to journalist Peter R. Neumann, during the Iraq War, "in the years that preceded the uprising, Assad and his intelligence services took the view that jihad could be nurtured and manipulated to serve the Syrian government's aims". Iraqi leaders such as former national security advisor Mowaffak al-Rubaie and former Prime Minister Nouri al-Maliki have accused Assad of harbouring and supporting jihadist insurgents in Iraq. US Army General David Petraeus would claim: "Bashar al-Asad was well aware that his brother-in-law 'Asif Shawqat, Director of Syrian Military Intelligence, had detailed knowledge of the activities of [al-Qaeda in Iraq] facilitator Abu Ghadiya, who was using Syrian territory to bring foreign fighters and suicide bombers into Iraq", with later cables adding that Petraeus thought that "in time, these fighters will turn on their Syrian hosts and begin conducting attacks against Bashar al-Assad's regime itself". Allegations of Syrian government support to Iraqi insurgents have been denied by Assad, former Syrian Vice President and opposition activist Abdul Halim Khaddam, and human rights activist Razan Zaitouneh.

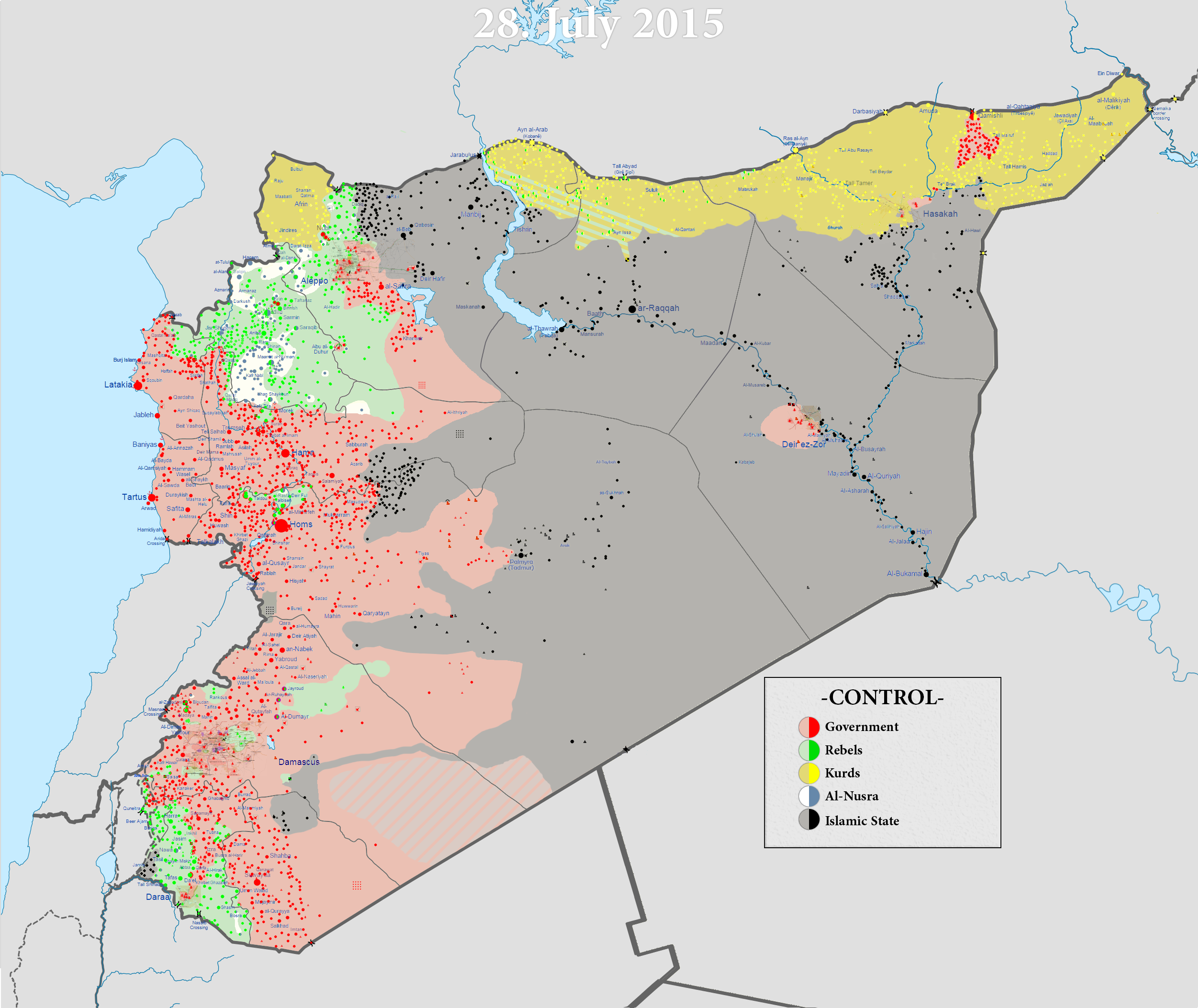
Military situation of the Syrian civil war in July 2015

During the ongoing Syrian civil war, the Syrian opposition and some analysts have accused President Bashar al-Assad and the Syrian government of strategically releasing Islamist prisoners during the start of the Syrian crisis in an attempt to strengthen jihadist factions over other rebels. The Syrian opposition have also accused Assad of having intelligence operatives within the ranks of ISIS, and even directing ISIS attacks. However, "despite repeated announcements by opposition figures", there exists "no solid evidence ... that the jihadists as a whole are controlled by the [Syrian] regime.

Several Western government officials have accused Assad of being in partnership with ISIS. Western officials stated in 2015 that the Syrian government and ISIS jointly ran a gas plant in Tabqah using intermediates to supply electricity to both government and ISIS-held areas. A report in 2015 suggested that ISIL kept gas flowing to Assad regime-controlled power stations. Furthermore, ISIL allowed grain to pass from Rojava to government-controlled areas at the cost of a 25% levy. ISIL defectors interviewed by academics in 2015 and 2016 reported being "disillusioned by... upsetting alliances that included the sale of wheat stores and oil to Assad." A businessman operating in both government and ISIL-controlled territory has claimed that "out of necessity" the Assad government has "had dealings with ISIS." The Wall Street Journal, citing documents captured from ISIS oil boss Abu Sayyaf (who was killed in a May 2015 raid by US forces), that "Abu Sayyaf's boss requested guidance on establishing investment relationships with businessmen linked to Syrian President Bashar al-Assad." In 2017, US and European officials said that oil sales to the Syrian government were ISIL's largest source of revenue.

An unpublished IHS Jane's Terrorism and Insurgency Center database analysis showed that only 6% of Syrian government forces attacks were targeted at ISIL from January to November 2014, while in the same period only 13% of all ISIL attacks targeted government forces. Academics who interviewed ISIL defectors in 2015–16 said their interviewees "observed regime forces strangely giving up territory to ISIS without much of a fight, and even leaving their weapons for ISIS rather than destroying them." In May 2015, Mario Abou Zeid of the Carnegie Middle East Center claimed that the recent Hezbollah offensive "has exposed the reality of the ISIL in Qalamoun; that it is operated by the Syrian regime's intelligence", after ISIS in the region engaged in probing attacks against FSA units at the outset of the fighting. Aymenn Jawad Al-Tamimi had disputed such assertions in 2014, arguing that "ISIS has a record of fighting the regime on multiple fronts", many rebel factions have engaged in oil sales to the Syrian regime because it is "now largely dependent on Iraqi oil imports via Lebanese and Egyptian third-party intermediaries", and while "the regime is focusing its airstrikes [on areas] where it has some real expectations of advancing" claims that it "has not hit ISIS strongholds" are "untrue". He concluded: "Attempting to prove an ISIS-regime conspiracy without any conclusive evidence is unhelpful, because it draws attention away from the real reasons why ISIS grew and gained such prominence: namely, rebel groups tolerated ISIS." Similarly, Max Abrahms and John Glaser stated in the Los Angeles Times in December 2017 that "The evidence of Assad sponsoring Islamic State... was about as strong as for Saddam Hussein sponsoring Al Qaeda." According to an April 2017 IHS Markit report, ISIS fought Syrian government forces more than any other opponent between 1 April 2016 and 31 March 2017: "43 percent of all Islamic State fighting in Syria was directed against President Assad's forces, 17 against the U.S.-backed Syrian Democratic Forces (SDF) and the remaining 40 percent involved fighting rival Sunni opposition groups".

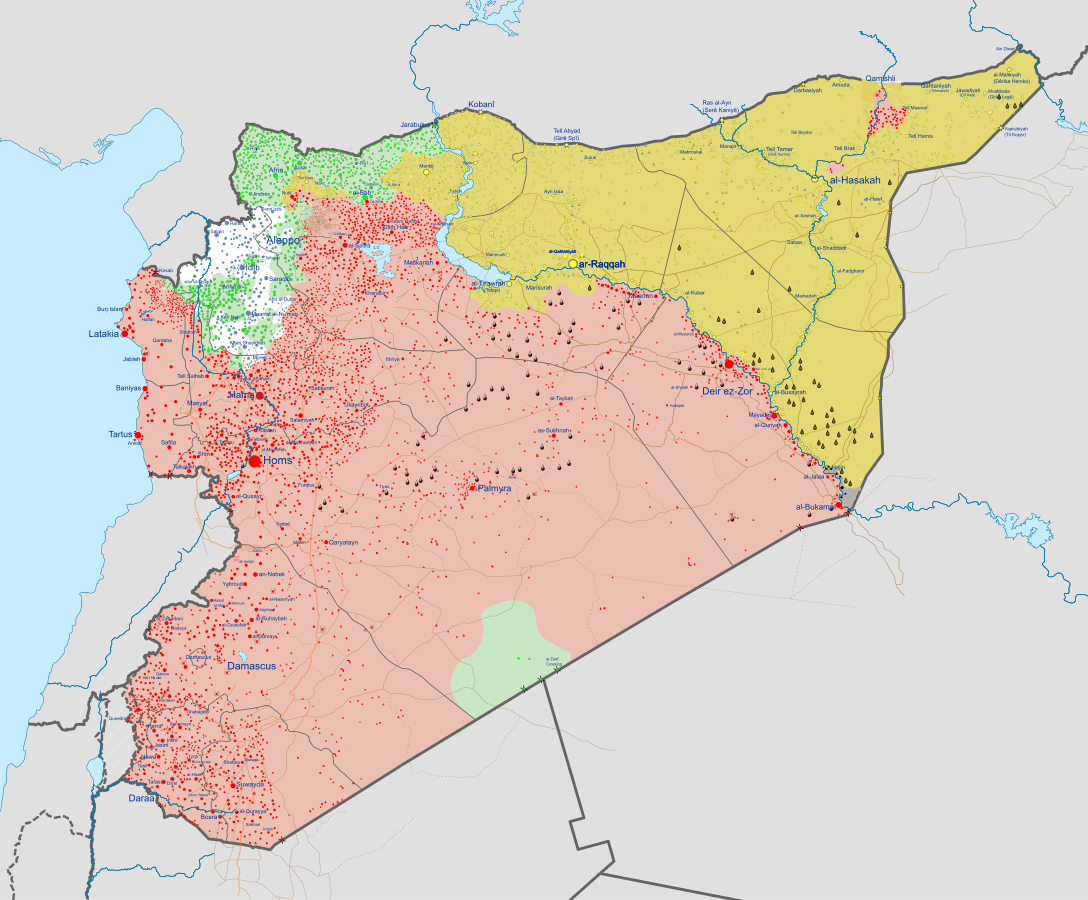
Military situation in January 2019

In 2015, the al-Nusra Front, al-Qaeda's Syrian affiliate, issued a bounty worth millions of dollars for the killing of Assad. In the course of the conflict, ISIS has repeatedly massacred pro-government Alawite civilians and executed captured Syrian Alawite soldiers, with most Alawites supporting Bashar al-Assad, himself an Alawite. ISIS, al-Nusra Front and affiliated jihadist groups reportedly took the lead in an offensive on Alawite villages in Latakia Governorate of Syria in August 2013.

== See also ==
- Foreign relations of Syria
- List of international presidential trips made by Bashar al-Assad
- Presidency of Hafez al-Assad

== Bibliography ==
- Harris, William W. (2012). Lebanon: A History, 600–2011. Oxford University Press. ISBN 9780190217839.
- Hinnebusch, Raymond; Ehteshami, Anoushiravan (2002). The Foreign Policies of Middle East States. Lynne Rienner Publishers. ISBN 9781588260208.
- Mansour, Imad; Thompson, William R. (2020). Shocks and Rivalries in the Middle East and North Africa. Georgetown University Press. ISBN 9781626167681.
- Sadiki, Larbi (2014). Routledge Handbook of the Arab Spring: Rethinking Democratization. Routledge. ISBN 978-0-415-52391-2.
