= 2003 Arab League summit =

Meeting of Arab regional organization

Arab League 21st summit
- Host country: Egypt
- Dates: 1 March 2003 - 3 March 2003
- Cities: Sharm el-Sheikh
- Participants: 22 countries
- Follows: 2002 Arab League summit
- Precedes: 2004 Arab League summit

The 2003 Arab League Summit was a meeting of 22 Arab countries from among the Arab League that took place in Sharm el-Sheikh, Egypt from the first to the third of March. The goal of the meeting was to create a common consensus on the planned American intervention of Iraq. The official final decision of the summit was a denouncement of "any attack on Iraq" and any American "attempts to impose changes in the region", although Arab countries were split on whether to support military action to force Saddam Hussein to disarm, and the league was ultimately unable to prevent a U.S led invasion which began 19 days later.

== Proposals ==
Syrian President Bashar al-Assad proposed a joint measure to deny the United States access to military bases and facilities within Arab countries, but this proposal was not mentioned in the official final decision.

On the third day of the summit, The United Arab Emirates boldly suggested Saddam Hussein comply with the demands of Washington and resign in effort to avoid war. President Sheikh Zayed ibn Sultan Al-Nahayan sent a message to the summit proposing that “Iraqi leadership should step down and leave Iraq... within two weeks of adopting this Arab initiative”. This proposal was supported by Bahrain but was soundly denounced by Iraqi delegates, who threatened to leave the summit in protest. They remained after intervention by Egyptian and Libyan leaders. The Arab League refused to discuss the proposal, leading Emirati Information Minister Sheikh Abdullah bin Zayed to later state “By refusing to discuss the UAE initiative, the Arabs have lost their last hope for an Arab solution to the Iraqi crisis.” He added: “If the Arab League had endorsed the UAE initiative, the US and the UN would have had no choice but to accept it, but the League lacks the courage to discuss this matter.".

== Incidents ==
On the second day of the summit, in an impromptu speech, Colonel Gaddafi of Libya harshly criticized Saudi Arabia's previous relationship with the United States resulting in a verbal altercation. He claimed that the Monarchy was willing to "strike an alliance with the devil" in order to protect itself during the invasion of Kuwait in 1990, when the United States placed troops in Saudi territory. Gaddafi then challenged King Abdullah to respond. Abdullah responded by rebuking Gaddafi and declaring that “Saudi Arabia is a front line county. Saudi Arabia is a Muslim nation. The Kingdom of Saudi is not an agent of colonialism, like you and others. Who brought you to power? Don’t say anything and don’t interfere in matters in which you don’t have any role". He ended his response by telling Gaddafi "You have [nothing but] lies behind you and [only] your grave awaits you” (Arabic: الكِذِب إمَامَك والقِبِر قدامك). This final line would be echoed by Gaddafi six years later at another confrontation at the Arab League Summit in 2009. As a result of this exchange, Gaddafi and Abdullah both stormed out of the hall, and the summit was put on a 20 minute break as the two of them were being calmed down.
