= List of diplomatic visits to Iraq =

List of state visits to Iraq

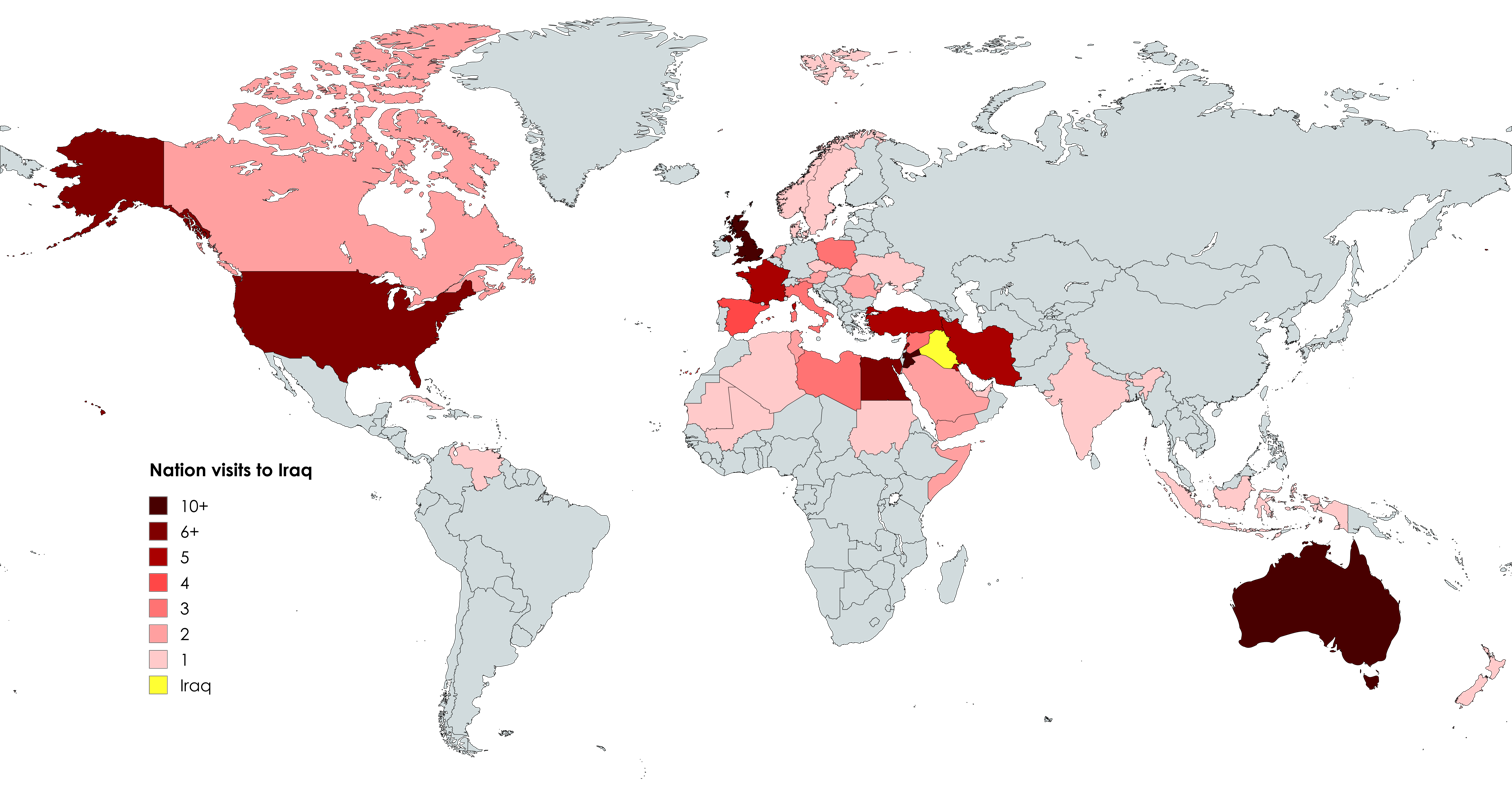
List of state visits to Iraq until January 1, 2025.

This is a list of foreign heads of state, heads of government who have visited the Iraq, which is classified by the Iraqi Ministry of Foreign Affairs as either a state visit, official visit, or working visit.

== Summary of visits ==
Country	Guest	Title	Date	Significance
• Republic of Iraq (2003–present)
United Nations	António Guterres	Secretary-General	May 17, 2025	34th Arab League summit
Arab League	Ahmed Aboul Gheit	Secretary-General	May 17, 2025	34th Arab League summit
Spain	Pedro Sanchez	Prime Minister	May 17, 2025	34th Arab League summit
Lebanon	Nawaf Salam	Prime Minister	May 17, 2025	34th Arab League summit
Jordan	Jafar Hassan	Prime Minister	May 17, 2025	34th Arab League summit
Yemen	Rashad al-Alimi	Chairman	May 17, 2025	34th Arab League summit
Qatar	Tamim bin Hamad Al Thani	Emir	May 17, 2025	34th Arab League summit
Palestine	Mahmoud Abbas	President	May 17, 2025	34th Arab League summit
Egypt	Abdel Fattah el-Sisi	President	May 17, 2025	34th Arab League summit
Somalia	Hassan Sheikh Mohamud	President	May 17, 2025	34th Arab League summit
Qatar	Mohammed bin Abdulrahman bin Jassim Al Thani	Prime Minister	March 24, 2025	
Iran	Masoud Pezeshkian	President	September 11–13, 2024	Official visit
Lebanon	Najib Mikati	President	July 21, 2024	Official visit
Turkey	Recep Tayyip Erdoğan	President	April 22–23, 2024	Official visit
Spain	Pedro Sánchez	Prime Minister	December 28, 2023	Official visit
Jordan	Bisher al-Khasawneh	Prime Minister	July 24, 2023	Official visit
United Nations	António Guterres	Secretary-General	February 28, 2023	
Italy	Giorgia Meloni	Prime Minister	December 23, 2022	
Lebanon	Najib Mikati	Prime Minister	October 25, 2021	Official visit
France	Emmanuel Macron	President	August 28–29, 2021	Baghdad Conference for Cooperation and Partnership
Egypt	Abdel Fattah el-Sisi	President	August 28, 2021	Baghdad Conference for Cooperation and Partnership
Jordan	Abdullah II of Jordan	King	August 28, 2021	Baghdad Conference for Cooperation and Partnership
Qatar	Tamim bin Hamad Al Thani	Emir	August 28, 2021	Baghdad Conference for Cooperation and Partnership
United Arab Emirates	Mohammed bin Rashid Al Maktoum	Prime Minister	August 28, 2021	Baghdad Conference for Cooperation and Partnership
Kuwait	Sabah Al-Khalid Al-Sabah	Prime Minister	August 28, 2021	Baghdad Conference for Cooperation and Partnership
Egypt	Abdel Fattah el-Sisi	President	June 28, 2021	Egypt-Jordan-Iraq summit
Jordan	Abdullah II of Jordan	King	June 28, 2021	Egypt-Jordan-Iraq summit
Vatican City	Pope Francis	Pope	March 5–8, 2021	
France	Emmanuel Macron	President	September 2, 2020	Official visit
Australia	David Hurley	Governor-General	December 20, 2019	Official visit
Norway	Erna Solberg	Prime Minister	October 21, 2019	Official visit
Kuwait	Sabah Al-Ahmad Al-Jaber Al-Sabah	Emir	June 19, 2019	Official visit
Iran	Hassan Rouhani	President	March 11–14, 2019	
Palestine	Mahmoud Abbas	President	March 3–4, 2019	
Spain	Felipe VI of Spain	King	January 30, 2019	Official visit
Canada	Julie Payette	Governor-General	January 20–21, 2019	
Jordan	Abdullah II of Jordan	King	January 13, 2019	
United States	Donald Trump	President	December 26, 2018	
Australia	Scott Morrison	Prime Minister	December 20, 2018	Secret visit
Australia	Peter Cosgrove	Governor-General	November 7, 2018	Secret visit
Australia	Peter Cosgrove	Governor-General	February 26, 2018	
Lebanon	Michel Aoun	President	February 20–21, 2018	Official visit
United Kingdom	Theresa May	Prime Minister	November 29, 2017	
Czech Republic	Bohuslav Sobotka	Prime Minister	August 26–27, 2017	Official visit
Australia	Malcolm Turnbull	Prime Minister	April 24, 2017	
United Nations	António Guterres	Secretary-General	March 30–31, 2017	
Turkey	Binali Yıldırım	Prime Minister	January 7–8, 2017	Official visit
France	François Hollande	President	January 2, 2017	Official visit
Sweden	Stefan Löfven	Prime Minister	October 24–25, 2016	
Netherlands	Mark Rutte	Prime Minister	August 9, 2016	Secret visit
United Nations	Ban Ki-moon	Secretary-General	March 26, 2016	
New Zealand	John Key	Prime Minister	October 6–8, 2015	Secret visit
Australia	Peter Cosgrove	Governor-General	August 9, 2015	
Canada	Stephen Harper	Prime Minister	May 2, 2015	
United Nations	Ban Ki-moon	Secretary-General	March 30, 2015	
Australia	Tony Abbott	Prime Minister	January 4, 2015	
Turkey	Ahmet Davutoğlu	Prime Minister	November 20–21, 2014	
France	François Hollande	President	September 12, 2014	
Italy	Matteo Renzi	Prime Minister	August 20, 2014	
Iran	Mahmoud Ahmadinejad	President	July 18–19, 2013	Official visit
United Nations	Ban Ki-moon	Secretary-General	December 6, 2012	
United Nations	Ban Ki-moon	Secretary-General	March 27–29, 2012	23rd Arab League summit
Arab League	Nabil Elaraby	Secretary-General	March 27–29, 2012	23rd Arab League summit
Kuwait	Sabah Al-Ahmad Al-Jaber Al-Sabah	Emir	March 27–29, 2012	23rd Arab League summit
Lebanon	Michel Suleiman	President	March 27–29, 2012	23rd Arab League summit
Palestine	Mahmoud Abbas	President	March 27–29, 2012	23rd Arab League summit
Tunisia	Moncef Marzouki	President	March 27–29, 2012	23rd Arab League summit
Mauritania	Mohamed Ould Abdel Aziz	President	March 27–29, 2012	23rd Arab League summit
Sudan	Omar al-Bashir	President	March 27–29, 2012	23rd Arab League summit
Djibouti	Ismaïl Omar Guelleh	President	March 27–29, 2012	23rd Arab League summit
Somalia	Sharif Sheikh Ahmed	President	March 27–29, 2012	23rd Arab League summit
Comoros	Ikililou Dhoinine	President	March 27–29, 2012	23rd Arab League summit
Libya	Mustafa Abdul Jalil	Chairman	March 27–29, 2012	23rd Arab League summit
Turkey	Recep Tayyip Erdoğan	Prime Minister	March 28–29, 2011	
Australia	Julia Gillard	Prime Minister	June 28, 2009	
United States	Barack Obama	President	April 7–8, 2009	
Palestine	Mahmoud Abbas	President	April 5, 2009	
France	Nicolas Sarkozy	President	February 10, 2009	
United Nations	Ban Ki-moon	Secretary-General	February 6, 2009	
United Kingdom	Gordon Brown	Prime Minister	December 17, 2008	
United States	George W. Bush	President	December 14, 2008	
Lebanon	Fouad Siniora	Prime Minister	August 20, 2008	
Jordan	Abdullah II of Jordan	King	August 12, 2008	
United Kingdom	Gordon Brown	Prime Minister	July 19, 2008	
Turkey	Recep Tayyip Erdoğan	Prime Minister	July 10, 2008	
Iran	Mahmoud Ahmadinejad	President	March 1–2, 2008	Official visit
Australia	Kevin Rudd	Prime Minister	December 21, 2007	
Poland	Donald Tusk	Prime Minister	December 19, 2007	
United Kingdom	Gordon Brown	Prime Minister	December 9, 2007	
United Kingdom	Gordon Brown	Prime Minister	October 3, 2007	
United States	George W. Bush	President	September 3, 2007	
United Kingdom	Tony Blair	Prime Minister	May 19, 2007	
Poland	Jarosław Kaczyński	Prime Minister	May 16, 2007	
United Nations	Ban Ki-moon	Secretary-General	March 22, 2007	Secret visit
Poland	Jarosław Kaczyński	Prime Minister	December 20, 2006	
Romania	Traian Băsescu	President	August 9, 2006	
United States	George W. Bush	President	June 13, 2006	
Denmark	Anders Fogh Rasmussen	Prime Minister	May 23, 2006	
United Kingdom	Tony Blair	Prime Minister	December 22, 2005	
United Nations	Kofi Annan	Secretary-General	November 12, 2005	
Australia	John Howard	Prime Minister	July 26, 2005	Secret visit
United Kingdom	Tony Blair	Prime Minister	December 21, 2004	
Ukraine	Viktor Yanukovych	Prime Minister	September 2–3, 2004	
Australia	John Howard	Prime Minister	April 25, 2004	
Italy	Silvio Berlusconi	Prime Minister	April 20, 2004	
Netherlands	Jan Peter Balkenende	Prime Minister	January 7, 2004	Secret visit
United Kingdom	Tony Blair	Prime Minister	January 4, 2004	
Spain	José María Aznar	Prime Minister	December 20, 2003	Secret visit
United States	George W. Bush	President	November 27, 2003	Secret visit
United Kingdom	Tony Blair	Prime Minister	May 29, 2003	
• Ba'athist Iraq (1968-2003)
Venezuela	Hugo Chavez	President	August 10, 2000	Official visit
United Nations	Kofi Annan	Secretary-General	February 20–22, 1998	
Palestine	Yasser Arafat	Chairman	February 3–4, 1993	
Palestine	Yasser Arafat	Chairman	January 1992	
Algeria	Chadli Bendjedid	President	December 1990	
Palestine	Yasser Arafat	Chairman	October 13–14, 1990	
Palestine	Yasser Arafat	Chairman	August, 1990	
Austria	Kurt Waldheim	President	August 25, 1990	
Jordan	Hussein of Jordan	King	August 14, 1990	
Jordan	Hussein of Jordan	King	August 3, 1990	
Egypt	Hosni Mubarak	President	July 24, 1990	Diplomatic visit
Jordan	Hussein of Jordan	King	July 17, 1990	Diplomatic visit
Arab League	Chedli Klibi	Secretary-General	May 28–30, 1990	1990 Arab League summit
Kuwait	Jaber al-Ahmad al-Sabah	Emir	May 28–30, 1990	1990 Arab League summit
Jordan	Hussein of Jordan	King	May 28–30, 1990	1990 Arab League summit
Saudi Arabia	Fahd of Saudi Arabia	King & Prime Minister	May 28–30, 1990	1990 Arab League summit
Egypt	Hosni Mubarak	President	May 28–30, 1990	1990 Arab League summit
Libya	Muammar Gaddafi	President	May 28–30, 1990	1990 Arab League summit
Yemen	Ali Abdullah Saleh	President	May 28–30, 1990	1990 Arab League summit
Tunisia	Zine El Abidine Ben Ali	President	May 28–30, 1990	1990 Arab League summit
Somalia	Siad Barre	President	May 28–30, 1990	1990 Arab League summit
Palestine	Yasser Arafat	Chairman	May 28–30, 1990	1990 Arab League summit
Saudi Arabia	Fahd of Saudi Arabia	King & Prime Minister	Late May–June 1, 1989	Official visit
Bahrain	Khalifa bin Salman Al Khalifa	Prime Minister	1989	
Egypt	Hosni Mubarak	President	October 24, 1988	Arafat-Hussein-Mubarak summit
Palestine	Yasser Arafat	Chairman	October 24, 1988	Arafat-Hussein-Mubarak summit
Egypt	Hosni Mubarak	President	September 7, 1988	
Jordan	Hussein of Jordan	King	September 6, 1987	
Palestine	Yasser Arafat	Chairman	1987	
Egypt	Hosni Mubarak	President	March 18, 1985	
Jordan	Hussein of Jordan	King	March 18, 1985	
Romania	Nicolae Ceaușescu	President	June 13, 1982	
Palestine	Yasser Arafat	Chairman	September 25, 1980	
Mali	Moussa Traoré	President	February 11, 1980	Official visit
Palestine	Yasser Arafat	Chairman	March 29, 1979	
Syria	Hafez al-Assad	President	November 2–5, 1978	9th Arab League summit
Lebanon	Élias Sarkis	President	November 2–5, 1978	9th Arab League summit
Lebanon	Selim Hoss	Prime Minister	November 2–5, 1978	9th Arab League summit
South Yemen	Ali Nasir Muhammad	Prime Minister	November 2–5, 1978	9th Arab League summit
Kuwait	Jaber al-Ahmad al-Sabah	Emir	November 2–5, 1978	9th Arab League summit
Jordan	Hussein of Jordan	King	November 2–5, 1978	9th Arab League summit
Libya	Muammar Gaddafi	Chairman	November 2–5, 1978	9th Arab League summit
Palestine	Yasser Arafat	Chairman	November 2–5, 1978	9th Arab League summit
Syria	Hafez al-Assad	President	October 24, 1978	Official visit
Spain	Juan Carlos I	King	1978	Official visit
Jordan	Hussein of Jordan	King	1978	
Austria	Bruno Kreisky	Chancellor	March 16, 1976	Official visit
France	Jacques Chirac	Prime Minister	February 17–18, 1975	Official visit
France	Valéry Giscard d'Estaing	President	February 17–18, 1975	Official visit
United Nations	Kurt Waldheim	Secretary-General	February 20, 1975	
India	Indira Gandhi	Prime Minister	January 18–21, 1975	Official visit
Cuba	Fidel Castro	President	September 10, 1973	Official visit
Syria	Hafez al-Assad	President	1973	
• Iraqi Republic (1958–1968)
Indonesia	Sukarno	President	2-5 April 1960	Official visit
• Kingdom of Iraq (1924–1958)
Jordan	Hussein of Jordan	King	1958	
Iran	Mohammad Reza Shah	Shah	March 11–12, 1955	Official visit
Transjordan	Abdullah I of Jordan	King	November 27, 1941	Official visit

== Most visited Official ==
As of 3 September 2025

Country	Official	Visit	Last Visit
Palestine	Yasser Arafat	10	February 4, 1993
Jordan	Hussein of Jordan	9*	August 14, 1990
Egypt	Hosni Mubarak	5	24 July 1990
United Kingdom	Tony Blair	5	May 19, 2007
Jordan	Abdullah II of Jordan	4	August 28, 2021
United Kingdom	Gordon Brown	4	December 17, 2008
United States	George W. Bush	4	December 14, 2008
Palestine	Mahmoud Abbas	4	May 17, 2025
Egypt	Abdel Fattah el-Sisi	3	May 17, 2025
Turkey	Recep Tayyip Erdoğan	3	April 23, 2024
Australia	Peter Cosgrove	3	November 7, 2018
Syria	Hafez al-Assad	3	November 5, 1978
Spain	Pedro Sánchez	2	May 17, 2025
Qatar	Tamim bin Hamad Al Thani	2	May 17, 2025
Lebanon	Najib Mikati	2	July 21, 2024
France	Emmanuel Macron	2	August 29, 2021
Kuwait	Sabah Al-Ahmad Al-Jaber Al-Sabah	2	June 19, 2019
Kuwait	Jaber al-Ahmad al-Sabah	2	May 30, 1990
Saudi Arabia	Fahd of Saudi Arabia	2	May 30, 1990
Iran	Mahmoud Ahmadinejad	2	July 19, 2013
Libya	Muammar Gaddafi	2	May 30, 1990
France	François Hollande	2	January 2, 2017
Poland	Jarosław Kaczyński	2	May 16, 2007
Australia	John Howard	2	July 26, 2005
*Hussein of Jordan visited Baghdad 61 times between 1980 and 1990.

== Most visit by Country ==
As of 3 September 2025

Country	Visit	Last Visit
Jordan	16*	May 17, 2025
Palestine	14	May 17, 2025
Australia	11	December 20, 2019
United Kingdom	10	November 29, 2017
Egypt	8	May 17, 2025
Lebanon	8	May 17, 2025
United States	6	December 26, 2018
France	6	August 29, 2021
Spain	5	May 17, 2025
Iran	5	September 13, 2024
Turkey	5	April 23, 2024
Kuwait	5	August 28, 2021
Italy	3	December 23, 2022
Libya	3	March 29, 2012
Poland	3	December 19, 2007
Syria	3	November 5, 1978
Somalia	3	May 17, 2025
Qatar	3	May 17, 2025
*Hussein of Jordan visited Baghdad 61 times between 1980 and 1990.

== See also ==
- List of state visits to Iran
- Iran–Iraq relations
