= List of international presidential trips made by Hafez al-Assad =

Diplomatic trip list

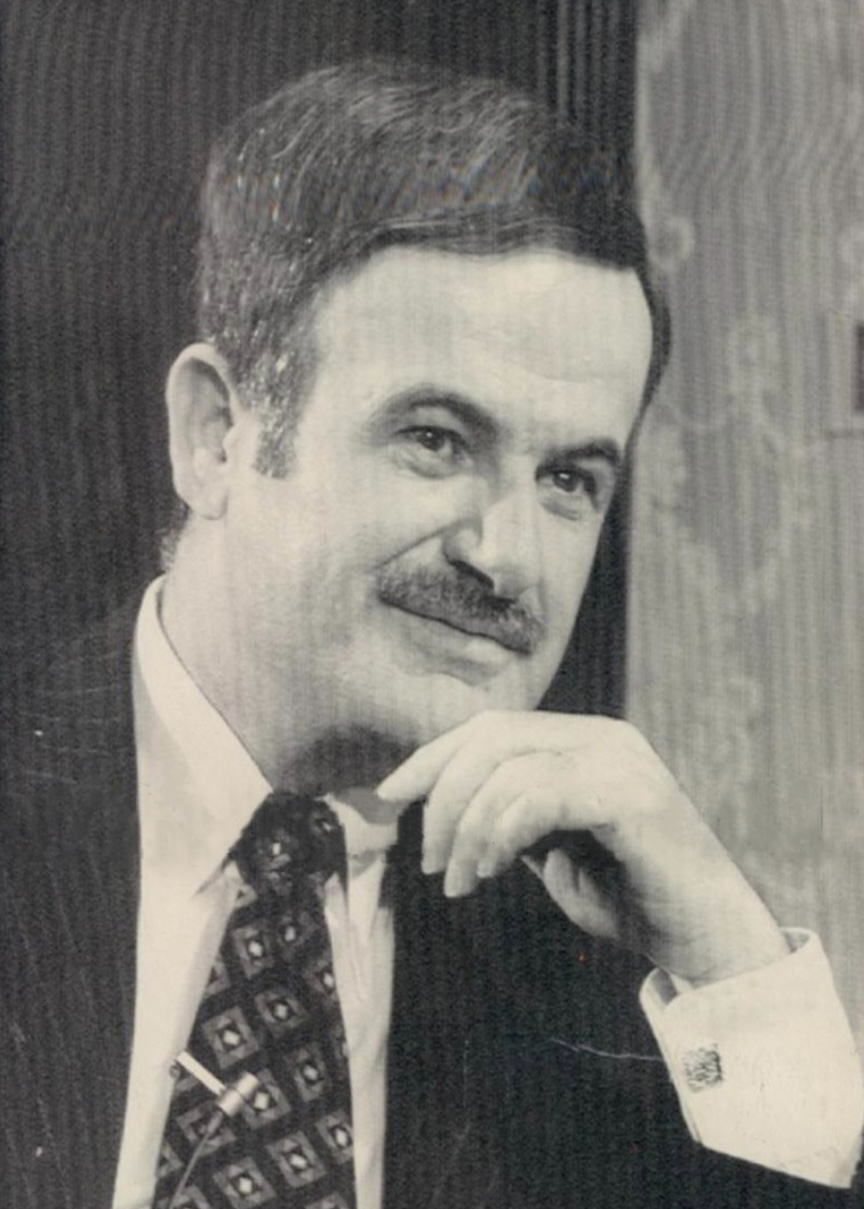
Assad in 1974

This is a list of international presidential trips made by Hafez al-Assad, president of Syria, during his presidency between 1971 and 2000.

== 1970s ==
=== 1971 ===
Country	Location	Date	Purpose	Ref.
Libya	Benghazi	17 April	Signing of the agreement to establish the Federation of Arab Republics between Egypt, Libya and Syria.	

=== 1972 ===
Country	Location	Date	Purpose	Ref.
Kuwait	Kuwait City	22 April		
Egypt	Mersa Matruh	19 June	Attended a meeting of the Federation of Arab Republics	
USSR	Moscow	July		
Egypt	Cairo	9 July		

=== 1973 ===
Country	Location	Date	Purpose	Ref.
Egypt	Cairo	7 February	Meeting with president Anwar Sadat and Colonel Muammar Gaddafi	
Egypt		April		
USSR	Moscow	7 May		

=== 1974 ===
Country	Location	Date	Purpose	Ref.
Lebanon	Beirut	18 January	Meeting with president Suleiman Frangieh	
Pakistan	Lahore	22–24 February	Attended the Organisation of the Islamic Conference Summit	
Yugoslavia	Belgrade	15 August	Meeting with President Josip Broz Tito	
Romania	Bucharest	9 September	Meeting with president Nicolae Ceaușescu	
Korea DPR	Pyongyang	September		
Morocco	Rabat	30 October	Attended the 7th Arab Summit Conference	

=== 1975 ===
Country	Location	Date	Purpose	Ref.
Lebanon	Beirut	7 January	Meeting with president Suleiman Frangieh	
Saudi Arabia	Riyadh	24 April	Attended the Arab Summit Conference	
Jordan	Amman	10 June	Meeting with Hussein bin Talal	
Czechoslovakia	Prague, Karlovy Vary	8–11 September	Meeting with Gustáv Husák	
USSR	Moscow	10 October		
Iran	Tehran	December		
Jordan	Amman	9–10 December	Meeting with Hussein bin Talal	

=== 1976 ===
Country	Location	Date	Purpose	Ref.
France	Paris	17–18 June	Meeting with president Valéry Giscard d'Estaing	
Yugoslavia	Belgrade	June		
Romania	Bucharest	27 June		
Saudi Arabia	Riyadh	16–18 October	Attended a six-party summit, which included the leaders of Egypt, Syria, Saudi Arabia, Lebanon, the Palestine Liberation Organization, and Kuwait to discuss the situation in Lebanon	
Jordan	Amman	6–7 December	Meeting with Hussein bin Talal	

=== 1977 ===
Country	Location	Date	Purpose	Ref.
Sudan	Khartoum	27 February	Attended trilateral summit with Sudanese president Gaafar Nimeiry and Egyptian president Anwar Sadat	
USSR	Moscow	19 April	Meeting with General Secretary Leonid Brezhnev	
Switzerland	Geneva	9 May	Meeting with U.S. president Jimmy Carter	
Libya	Tripoli	2 December	Attended a summit with the participation of the leaders of Algeria, Iraq, Libya, the PLO and South Yemen to discuss Sadat's initiative	
Saudi Arabia	Riyadh	9 December	Meeting with Crown Prince Fahd	
United Arab Emirates	Abu Dhabi	12 December	Meeting with Sheikh Zayed bin Sultan Al Nahyan	

=== 1978 ===
Country	Location	Date	Purpose	Ref.
USSR	Moscow	20–22 February		
India	New Delhi	18 April	Meeting with Prime Minister Indira Gandhi	
West Germany	Bonn	12 September		
East Germany		1 October		
USSR	Moscow	6 October		
Iraq	Baghdad	25–27 October	Working visit	
Iraq	Baghdad	2 November	Attended the Arab Summit Conference	
Hungary	Budapest	29 November		

=== 1979 ===
Country	Location	Date	Purpose	Ref.
Iraq	Baghdad	16–17 June	Meeting with president Ahmed Hassan al-Bakr	
Algeria	Algiers	3 July	Meeting with president Chadli Benjedid	
USSR	Moscow	15–18 October		

== 1980s ==
=== 1980 ===
Country	Location	Date	Purpose	Ref.
Yugoslavia	Belgrade	4 May	Attended the state funeral of Josip Broz Tito	
Libya	Tripoli		Held unification talks with Muammar Gaddafi	
USSR	Moscow	8–10 October	Meeting with General Secretary Leonid Brezhnev	

=== 1981 ===
Country	Location	Date	Purpose	Ref.
Saudi Arabia	Mecca & Taif	25–29 January	Attended the Organisation of the Islamic Conference Summit	

=== 1982 ===
Country	Location	Date	Purpose	Ref.
Saudi Arabia	Taif	5 July	Meeting with King Fahd	

=== 1983 ===
Country	Location	Date	Purpose	Ref.
India	New Delhi			
Saudi Arabia	Jeddah	9 May	Meeting with King Fahd	

=== 1985 ===
Country	Location	Date	Purpose	Ref.
USSR	Moscow	19 June	Meeting with Chairman Mikhail Gorbachev	

=== 1986 ===
Country	Location	Date	Purpose	Ref.
Jordan	Amman	5 May	Meeting with Hussein bin Talal	
Greece	Athens	26–28 May	State visit	

=== 1987 ===
Country	Location	Date	Purpose	Ref.
Kuwait	Kuwait City	26–29 January	Attended the Organisation of the Islamic Conference Summit	
USSR	Moscow	27–29 April	Meeting with Chairman Mikhail Gorbachev	
Bulgaria	Sofia	October	Meeting with Todor Zhivkov	

== 1990s ==
=== 1990 ===
Country	Location	Date	Purpose	Ref.
Egypt	Cairo	14–16 July	Meeting with president Hosni Mubarak	
Egypt	Cairo	10 August	Attended the Arab Summit Conference on the Iraqi-Kuwaiti crisis	
Iran	Tehran	26 September		

=== 1992 ===
Country	Location	Date	Purpose	Ref.
Kuwait	Kuwait City	20 April	Meeting with Emir Jaber Al-Ahmad Al-Sabah	

=== 1994 ===
Country	Location	Date	Purpose	Ref.
Egypt	Cairo	4–5 April	Meeting with president Hosni Mubarak	

=== 1997 ===
Country	Location	Date	Purpose	Ref.
Iran	Tehran	1 August	State visit	
Iran	Tehran	9–11 December	Attended the Organisation of the Islamic Conference Summit	

=== 1998 ===
Country	Location	Date	Purpose	Ref.
France	Paris	18 July	Meeting with president Jacques Chirac	

=== 1999 ===
Country	Location	Date	Purpose	Ref.
Jordan	Amman	February	Attended the funeral of Hussein bin Talal	
Russia	Moscow	7 July	Meeting with president Boris Yeltsin	

== 2000s ==
=== 2000 ===
Country	Location	Date	Purpose	Ref.
Switzerland	Geneva	26 March	Meeting with US president Bill Clinton	
Egypt	Cairo	9 May	Meeting with president Hosni Mubarak	

== See also ==
- List of international presidential trips made by Bashar al-Assad, his son and successor
- Presidency of Hafez al-Assad
- Foreign relations of Syria
