= Ninth Extraordinary Session of the Islamic Summit Conference =

18 October 2023 summit in Saudi Arabia amid the Gaza war

- October 18, 2023
- Host country: Saudi Arabia
- Cities: Jeddah
- Venues: General Secretariat headquarters, Jeddah
- Participants: Member states of the Organization of Islamic Cooperation (OIC)

The Ninth Extraordinary Session of the Islamic Summit Conference was organized by the Organization of Islamic Cooperation (OIC) in response to the Gaza war. The meeting occurred on 18 October 2023 at the General Secretariat headquarters in Jeddah, Saudi Arabia.

== Background ==
The urgent meeting was prompted by the attacks initiated by Hamas on Israel on October 7, which resulted in significant loss of life. In responded, Israel conducted retaliatory strikes on Gaza.

Iran called for an emergency meeting of the OIC during the intense fighting between Hamas and Israeli forces. This call was subsequently supported by other member states, leading to the convening of an extraordinary meeting. As a result, the OIC completed the necessary preparations for convening an open-ended, emergency special meeting at the ministerial level. The purpose of this meeting was to address the aggression against Gaza and the worsening humanitarian situation there.

== Objectives ==
The primary goal of this meeting was to tackle the ongoing crisis in Gaza and its neighboring regions, paying specific attention to the worsening conditions that endanger civilian lives and regional stability.

== Outcomes ==
Various Muslim countries attended the session, expressing their concerns and positions regarding the Gaza war.

Iran urges Muslim countries to impose sanctions on Israel following an attack on a hospital in Gaza. This included a demand for an oil embargo, which briefly caused a jump in crude prices. However, OPEC announced that it had no immediate plans to response to Iran's call. Additionally, Iran called on Muslim states to boycott Israel.

Pakistan demanded that the international community hold Israel accountable for war crimes. Pakistan's Foreign Minister, Jalil Abbas Jilani emphasized the need for bold decisions until a sovereign Palestinian state, with East Jerusalem as its capital is established.

Saudi Arabia’s Foreign Minister, Faisal bin Farhan Al-Saud called for lifting of the blockade and the establishment of humanitarian corridors in Gaza. He also rejected the forced displacement of Palestinians.

Turkey urged the Muslim world to take action for the establishment of a Palestinian state.

== See also ==
- 2023 Arab League summit
- Arab Islamic extraordinary summit 2023
- International reactions to the Gaza war
- 2023 Gaza humanitarian crisis
