= 2004 Arab League summit =

Historical summit of the Arab League in 2004

Arab League 22nd summit
- Host country: Tunisia
- Date: 22 May 2004
- Cities: Tunis
- Follows: 2003 Arab League summit
- Precedes: 2005 Arab League summit

The 2004 Arab League summit was a gathering of the members of the Arab League in Tunis, Tunisia on May 22, 2004. It was initially planned for March of that same year but was postponed due to disagreements within the league regarding the Bush administration's pressure for reforms. The result of the summit was a resolution reaffirming the integrity of Iraq, condemning the Israeli treatment of Palestinians, and committing to the pursuit of democratic reforms in the region.

== Postponement ==
The summit was initially planned for March 2004, but was postponed after half of the Arab League countries withdrew their attendance. The reason for the postponement was an inability for the Arab leaders to determine how they would respond to pressure from Washington to adopt policies of reform in the wake of the 2003 invasion of Iraq, as well as a Bush proposal regarding a two-state solution peace initiative between Israel and Palestine.

== Incidents ==
In response to Colonel Muammar Gaddafi of Libya's repeated indications of a desire to withdrawal Libya from the Arab League, Secretary General Amr Mussa condemned attempts to undermine the league and the "voices" that advocated for its breakup. Gaddafi, feeling insulted, responded by storming out of the session. Gaddafi's withdrawal from the summit was also made in protest to the Arab League pursuing a two-state solution. Gaddafi declared that “Unfortunately Libya is forced to boycott the summit because it does not agree to the agenda of the Arab governments. Libya wants the agenda of the Arab peoples".
