= 2008 Arab League summit =

Meeting of Arab regional organization

Arab League summit
- Host country: Syria
- Date: March 29, 2008
- Cities: Damascus
- Follows: 2009 Arab League summit
- Precedes: 2007 Arab League summit

The 2008 Arab League summit was held in Damascus on March 29, 2008. The summit was marred by inter-Arab differences, mainly over the political deadlock in Lebanon, with relations between Syria and the Saudi-Egypt coalition reaching an all-time low. Saudi Arabia and Egypt snubbed the summit by sending low-level representatives. Lebanon's majority government boycotted the summit
