= 2007 Arab League summit =

Meeting of Arab regional organization

Arab League summit
- Host country: Saudi Arabia
- Date: March 24, 2007
- Cities: Riyadh
- Follows: 2006 Arab League summit
- Precedes: 2008 Arab League summit

The 2007 Arab League Summit, also called the 2007 Riyadh Summit, refers to a convention of leaders from 21 members of the Arab League who gathered in Riyadh for the 19th Arab summit in March 2007. The summit convened on the 28 March 2007 and was preceded by a set of preparatory meetings starting on 24 March 2007. United Nations Secretary General Ban Ki-moon and the European Union's foreign policy chief Javier Solana also attended the summit. The main goal of the conference was to re-launch the Arab Peace Initiative.

== Setting ==
The original venue of the 19th Arab summit was to be Sharm El-Sheikh, Egypt, but, in mid-January 2007, Amr Moussa, Secretary-General of the Arab League, announced that the summit would convene in Riyadh. This, according to scholars, seemed an "indication that Saudi Arabia was keen to promote the cause of Arab unity." Ambassador Mohamed Qattan, Saudi permanent representative to the Arab League, said, "The ongoing developments in the Arab region and the critical situation that the Arab peoples are passing through has prompted the Saudi monarch to call for the convocation of the summit in Riyadh rather than Sharm El-Sheikh." Egyptian leaders did not publicly question the matter.

The venue, date and agenda of the annual Arab summit have always been an issue of contention, speculation and controversy. When Arab leaders met in Cairo in October 2000 to adopt a resolution proposing the annual convocation of the Arab summit, they decided that the chairmanship of the summit would be rotated among the 22 member states of the League, and that the summit should convene at the headquarters of the Arab League unless the chair wished to host it. In March 2001, Jordan chaired and hosted the Arab summit. This, however, was the first and last time in which the convocation of the Arab summit was a smooth operation.

A major issue that marred the 2007 Arab League summit was the absence of Libya. According to Libyan Foreign Minister Abdel Rahman Shalgham, Libya boycotted the summit in protest of the lack of "seriousness" of Arab countries. "All the Arabs now consider Iran to be the main enemy and have forgotten Israel," said Shalgham. While Arabs "keep pressing the Palestinians to respond to the conditions of the (Middle East) Quartet, no one presses Israel." In January 2007, Moussa traveled to Libya to discuss the matter with Libyan leader, Muammar al-Gaddafi. Moussa aimed to secure Libya's participation in the Riyadh summit but ultimately failed. Libya's absence has also been attributed to a public quarrel that al-Gaddafi had with King Abdullah bin Abdul Aziz of Saudi Arabia in 2003 over the United States military presence in the region. Gaddafi would later go on to once again publicly reject the Arab Peace Initiative, stating: "The Arab initiative is nothing more than an Arab scheme, these massacres (in Gaza) were caused because of it. It has encouraged the enemy to do it. We should be ashamed of such proposals."

== The negotiations ==
The main areas of discussion in the summit:

- The Israeli–Palestinian conflict
- A resolution to tensions in Iraq

=== Israeli–Palestinian conflict ===
The 19th annual Arab League summit reaffirmed the Arab Peace Initiative first adopted in 2002 (also known as the Beirut Declaration). Arab leaders at the summit urged Israel to accept this initiative. Saudi Foreign Minister Prince Saud al-Faisal said that the plan would have a strong chance of winning international support and of reviving Israeli–Arab peace talks if adopted unanimously by all Arab leaders. The plan, moreover, set up a mechanism to promote the peace plan that would pave the way for Arab countries with no ties to Israel, including Saudi Arabia, to open channels of communications with the Jewish state—a longtime goal for various presidential administrations in the United States. The peace initiative, as Middle Eastern scholars explain, was considered a "great leap from historical resolutions of 1964 and 1967, which had vowed to destroy Israel." Under the plan, Arab nations would recognize Israel if Israel withdrew from land it occupied in the 1967 Arab-Israeli war. Moreover, the plan allows for the creation of a Palestinian state—with its capital in East Jerusalem—and the return of Palestinian refugees based on United Nations General Assembly Resolution 194. The final draft of the plan, moreover, avoided mentioning the phrase "right of return", which has been a point of contention in all previous peace talks; instead it called for a "just solution to the Palestinian refugee problem."

In 2002, Israel immediately rejected the plan. In 2007, however, Israel initially acted more receptively to the reaffirmed Arab League initiative. Nevertheless, the foreign policy spokesman for Israel's right-wing Likud party, Zalman Shoval, explained "Israel could never accept the parts of the plan that call for the return of refugees who had lived in the territory of pre-1967 Israel." Furthermore, Shoval added, "If 300,000–400,000, or maybe a million, Palestinians would invade the country, that would be the end of the state of Israel as a Jewish state."

According to the scholar, Roger Hardy, the 2002 Arab Peace Initiative was revived "because it is a starting point on the Palestinian issue that most parties can accept—although with reservations." Moreover, some have speculated that the re-initialization of the peace plan was a move to counter Iran's growing influence in the region. It was widely viewed by scholars around the world that it would be in Israel's best interest to act respectfully to Saudi Arabia's supremacy in Middle East affairs, especially if Arab states begin to line up behind an anti-Iranian position. Through positive actions, Israel could eventually become accepted into the Arab world.

=== Obstacles to the Arab Peace Initiative ===
Differences of principle between Israel and Arab League members over some of the elements in the proposed arrangement made it difficult to translate the initiative into an actual agreement. Moreover, the absence of an authoritative Palestinian interlocutor was another impediment to achieving peace through the Arab Peace Initiative. The President of the Palestinian Authority, Mahmoud Abbas, supported the initiative, but Hamas leaders refrained from endorsing even the conditional readiness to recognize Israel. As part of an effort to bridge that gap and lay the foundation for a unified Palestinian delegation, pre-Summit preparations included diplomatic steps to establish a Palestinian national unity government. That government was sworn in on March 17, 2007, on the basis of the agreement reached in Mecca under the aegis of the so-called "Arab Quartet"—Saudi Arabia, Egypt, Jordan, and the United Arab Emirates.

The national unity government's policy guidelines include detailed political positions, including an obligation to create a Palestinian state in the territories captured by Israel in 1967 and the recognition of Arab Summit conference resolutions over the years. To that list was added Palestinian recognition of Israel, which Hamas refused to embrace. In addition, Hamas continually demands a "right of return" for all Palestinians who fled or were driven out of what is now Israel during the 1948 Arab–Israeli War. Hamas leader Khaled Meshaal was quoted by Saudi media as urging Arab leaders ahead of the summit not to make concessions on the demand for the Palestinian refugees to return home. Hamas refuses to recognize Israel, but Palestinian officials have agreed not to go against the peace plan. Moreover, on the eve of the Riyadh summit, American Secretary of State Condoleezza Rice persuaded Israeli Prime Minister Ehud Olmert and Abbas to agree to meet on a regular basis, but Israel maintained its economic embargo on the Palestinian government and its military pressure in the territory of the Palestinian Authority. These measures were viewed as a means to either weaken Hamas or, alternatively, to encourage a change in its position vis-à-vis Israel.

The power struggle in Palestine will, consequently, make it impossible to implement any security understandings reached in the past or future between Israel and Abbas. The official statement from the Israeli Foreign Ministry Spokesman said, "Israel is sincerely interested in pursuing a dialogue with those Arab states that desire peace with Israel, this in order to promote a process of normalization and cooperation. Israel hopes that the Riyadh Summit will contribute to this effort." Furthermore, the Israeli spokesman explained, "Israel also believes that moderate Arab states can fill a positive role by encouraging regional cooperation, and supporting the Israeli–Palestinian track. A dialogue between these states and Israel can contribute to this end." Many Israelis were disenchanted, however, especially when remembering the results of previous Arab League summits and the current Hamas-dominated Palestinian leadership. The hope, however, is that the political partnership with Fatah will move Hamas closer to the center of Palestinian politics. Moreover, the revival of the 2002 Arab Peace Initiative is clearly a product of inter-Arab politics that reflects hope for a peaceful conclusion to the Israeli–Palestinian conflict.

=== Resolution to Tensions in Iraq ===
Leaders of the Arab League present at the Riyadh Summit in 2007 hoped to achieve security and stability in Iraq. The Iraqi Foreign Minister, Hoshyar Zebari revealed that draft laws in support of Iraq would arise at the Riyadh summit. Iraqi President Jalal Talabani expressed optimism for the possibilities of such laws. Leaders at the summit stated that "Iraq's stability and overcoming of its present crisis required a balanced political and security solution addressing the causes of the crisis and weeding out the roots of terrorism and sectarian sedition." Moreover, the leaders stressed, "The Arab perception of a political and security solution for the challenges faced by Iraq is based on respect for Iraq’s unity, sovereignty, independence and Arab-Islamic identity." Furthermore, Arab leaders at the Riyadh summit stressed that the establishment of security and stability is the sole responsibility of the Iraqi national unity government, constitutional institutions, and political leaders. Also, the summit strongly condemned the acts of terror against the Iraqi people and their institutions. Moreover, leaders showed their support for the Iraqi government's efforts to reorganize its security institutions on nationalistic and professional basis, calling for effective Arab participation in these efforts. Furthermore, leaders urged member states to write off debts owed by Iraq.

== Other areas of negotiation ==
The member-states at the Riyadh conference asserted that Arab states should fully tackle issues of Arab national security. Furthermore, sources and forms of political, security, economic, cultural, and social threats from both inside and outside the Arab world would be taken into consideration. Moreover, the conference:

- Decided to convene a consultative summit in the future to tackle specific issues, if necessary. Closed-door discussions would be confined to the issue of concern.
- An open expert-level task force will be formed to determine the nature of current and future risks and challenges facing the Arab ummah and forge appropriate proposals.
- The conference confirmed complete support for the Makkah Document, appreciating efforts exerted by other Arab countries, the Arab League, and Organisation of the Islamic Conference, which contributed to reaching the agreement, which resulted in the formation of a national unity government.
- Arab leaders reiterated full Arab solidarity with Lebanon and their promise to provide political and economic support to the Lebanese government in such a way that maintains Lebanese national unity as well as Lebanese security, stability and sovereignty over all its territory. Moreover, Arab leaders welcomed the seven-point plan presented by the Lebanese government, calling on the UN Secretary General and Security Council to take the Lebanese proposal, included in this plan regarding Sheba'a Farms area, into consideration when the UN Secretary General presents his proposals on this subject in accordance with Security council resolution number 1701 and 1702. Furthermore, the conference adopted a plan for supporting Lebanon during the reconstruction phase and the development of its economy presented by the economic and social council, which met in Beirut on 16-17/10/2006.
- The meeting strongly condemned international terrorism, noting that the Arab states are effectively participating in anti-terror efforts.
- Arab leaders stressed their support for the United Arab Emirates’ full sovereignty over the three islands of Greater and Lesser Tomb and Abu Musa. Moreover, it also condemned Iran’s continued occupation of these Islands.
- Leaders also underlined Libya's legitimate right to indemnifications for the damage resulting from sanctions imposed on it.
- Leaders stressed the need for the Sudanese government and the African Union to continue their efforts to establish security and stability in Darfur. The conference also called upon armed groups that failed to sign the Darfur peace agreement to renounce military escalation.
- The summit welcomed the African Union’s decision to send African troops to bolster stability in Somalia. It also called on member states to extend various forms of support to the Somali government.
- Leaders decided to convene an extra ordinary ministerial level meeting of the Arab League Council, preceded by a meeting of commitment of senior Arab officials to evaluate Arab efforts to rid the Middle East region of nuclear and other weapons of mass destruction.
- The meetings asked the Secretary General to pursue efforts and contacts with the European Union presidency and the European commission to develop collective Arab-European relations.
- Leaders expressed keenness in enhancing relations with China.
- The council approved the general structure of the Executive program of the Arab customs union. Moreover, it also approved the continuous Arab agricultural development strategy.
- Arab leaders urged Arab states to study the enactment of laws and regulations to encourage inter-Arab tourism.

== Aftermath ==
Through the Riyadh Summit, Arab leaders "re-launched their blueprint for peace in the Middle East." As the Riyadh Declaration shows, leaders of the Arab world hoped to "reexamine their state of affairs." Islam, moreover, was used as a uniting factor to achieve peace:

"We are inspired by our religious and Arab values that renounce all forms of immoderation, extremism and racism; and stressing the aims of boosting the Arab identity, deepening its cultural bases, and continuing its open humanistic message, while facing the challenges and risks threatening to re-schematize the state of affairs in the region, dissolve the common Arab identity, and undermine the connections that bind us." Throughout its history, Professor of Middle East Studies, Roger Owen explains, "the Arab League has acted as though the Arab states should conduct their relations in terms more of notions of brotherhood than of protocol." Moreover, the leaders at Riyadh explain, "We are all, leaders, officials and citizens; parents and children; partners in drawing our own destiny and preserving our identity, culture, values and interests. Dangerous challenges can only increase the resolve and faith of great nations. The Arab nation is capable, with God’s help, to achieve the security, dignity, and prosperity it deserves when it unifies its ranks and strengthens its joint actions."

To date, Israeli Prime Minister Ehud Olmert has "not agreed to fully-fledged negotiations over the three main final status issues – borders, the status of Jerusalem and Palestinian refugees – as proposed by Mr. Abbas. Israeli officials said any commitment now could raise expectations and lead to further violence if talks broke down."

Moreover, Saudi Arabia still has not created diplomatic ties with Israel because of Israel's continued negative treatment of Palestinians.

The situation in Iraq is still grim; stability still has not been achieved.

In many ways, it is too soon to tell whether the Riyadh Summit of 2007 has had long-lasting positive effects on tensions in the Middle East. Its resolutions, however, were a positive step in the right direction.

Upon completion of the summit meeting, leaders of the Arab League decided to reconvene for the 20th Arab League summit in Syria in March 2008.
