= 2006 Arab League summit =

Meeting of Arab regional organization

Arab League summit
- Arab League flag
- Host country: Sudan
- Date: March 28, 2006–May 30, 2006
- Cities: Khartoum
- Venues: Organisation of Islamic Conference
- Follows: 2005 Arab League summit
- Precedes: 2007 Arab League summit

The 2006 Arab League Summit took place in Khartoum, Sudan, on March 28–30 2006. While speakers at the summit called for increased Arab sovereignty and stronger alliances between Arab states, it did not lead to any plans for action to those ends, and Qatari media outlet Al-Jazeera called it a "nadir" in the history of League summits.
