= 2005 Arab League summit =

Meeting of Arab regional organization

2005 Arab League Summit
- Host country: Algeria
- Date: 22–23 March 2005
- Cities: Algiers
- Venues: Palais des Nations
- Participants: 22 countries
- Chair: Abdelaziz Bouteflika
- Follows: 2004 Arab League summit
- Precedes: 2006 Arab League summit

The 2005 Arab League summit, officially 17th Ordinary Session of the Council of the League of Arab States at the Summit Level, was a regular summit that was held in Algiers, Algeria in March 2005.

The city hosted the summit for the third time, following 1973 and 1988. Prior to the conference, the foreign ministers met to agree on proposals that will be presented to the Leaders for approval. The Palestinian issue, the unrest in Lebanon and Iraq, Egypt's bid for a permanent seat on the Security Council, and political reform in the member nations were all topics of discussion at the summit.

== Participating leaders ==
Yemen, Bahrain, Oman, Jordan, and Lebanon's leaders did not attend the summit due to work commitments.

- Arab League – Secretary-General Amr Moussa
- Algeria – President Abdelaziz Bouteflika (host)
- Bahrain – Crown Prince Salman bin Hamad Al Khalifa
- Egypt – President Hosni Mubarak
- Iraq – President (interim) Ghazi Mashal Ajil al-Yawer
- Jordan – Prime Minister Faisal Al-Fayez
- Kuwait – Crown Prince Sabah Al-Ahmad Al-Jaber Al-Sabah
- Lebanon – Foreign Minister Mahmoud Hammoud
- Libya – Leader Muammar Gaddafi
- Mauritania – President Maaouya Ould Sid'Ahmed Taya
- Morocco – King Mohammed VI
- Oman – Deputy Prime Minister Fahd bin Mahmoud al Said
- Palestine – President Mahmoud Abbas
- Qatar – Emir Hamad bin Khalifa Al Thani
- Saudi Arabia – Crown Prince Abdullah bin Abdulaziz Al Saud
- Sudan – President Omar al-Bashir
- Syria – President Bashar al-Assad
- Tunisia – President Zine El Abidine Ben Ali
- United Arab Emirates – Ruler of Fujairah Hamad bin Mohammed Al Sharqi
- Yemen – Vice-president Abdrabbuh Mansur Hadi
