= 1990 Arab League emergency summit =

Meeting of Arab regional organization

1990 Arab League Emergency Summit
- Host country: Egypt
- Date: August 10, 1990
- Cities: Cairo
- Chair: Hosni Mubarak
- Secretary: Chedli Klibi
- Follows: May 1990

On August 10, 1990, an emergency Arab League summit was held in Cairo, Egypt, to address the Iraqi invasion of Kuwait, which had begun on August 2. It was initially scheduled for August 9 but was postponed due to differences in viewpoints. However, some spokespersons indicated that the delay was intended to allow the Tunisian and Yemeni delegations additional time to arrive.

The summit was convened at the invitation of Egyptian President Hosni Mubarak. In a departure from standard procedure, no preparatory meeting of foreign ministers was held to establish the summit’s agenda. Tunisia, which hosted the Arab League headquarters at the time, did not attend the summit after its request to postpone the meeting until after a ministerial session was denied. The timing of President Mubarak's call for the summit coincided with a speech by U.S. President George H. W. Bush announcing the deployment of American forces to Saudi Arabia, as well as Iraq's declaration of unity with Kuwait, calling it "final and irreversible".

== The summit ==
The conference commenced at precisely 12:20 p.m. with an address delivered by President Hosni Mubarak, in which he underscored the imperative for Iraqi forces to undertake an immediate withdrawal from Kuwaiti territory, to refrain from interfering in Kuwait's internal affairs, and to revoke all decisions and actions taken in contravention of these principles. The representative of Iraq objected to the participation of the Kuwaiti delegation. The summit proceedings were interrupted by a dispute between its chair, President Mubarak, and the Libyan leader, Muammar Gaddafi, over the legitimacy of adopting the resolution without unanimity, as stipulated by the Charter. Mubarak claimed that the proposal originated from the Omani representative, Fahr bin Taimur, Deputy Prime Minister for Security and Defense Affairs.

== Participants in the summit ==
Country	Representative	Note
Algeria	President Chadli Bendjedid	
Bahrain	Emir Isa bin Salman Al Khalifa	
Djibouti		
Egypt	President Hosni Mubarak	
Jordan	Hussein bin Talal	
Iraq	First Deputy Prime Minister and Member of the Revolutionary Command Council Taha Yassin Ramadan	
Kuwait	Prime Minister Saad Al-Salim Al-Sabah	
Lebanon	President Elias Hrawi	
Libya	Leader Muammar Gaddafi	
Mauritania	President Maaouya Ould Taya	
Morocco	King Hassan II	
Oman	Deputy Prime Minister for Security and Defense Fahr bin Taimur	
Qatar	Emir Khalifa bin Hamad Al Thani	
Palestine	Chairman Yasser Arafat	
Saudi Arabia	King Fahd of Saudi Arabia	
Somalia		
Sudan	President Omar al-Bashir	
Syria	President Hafez al-Assad	
Yemen	President Ali Abdullah Saleh	

== Final Communiqué ==
- Support (12): Bahrain, Djibouti, Egypt, Kuwait, Lebanon, Morocco, Oman, Qatar, Saudi Arabia, Somalia, Syria, United Arab Emirates
- Against (2): Iraq, Libya
- Reservation (3): Mauritania, Palestine, Sudan
- Abstention (3): Algeria, Jordan, Yemen

== Reactions ==
White House spokesperson Marlin Fitzwater praised the Arab League’s initiative as "a positive and important statement," delivering a "strong condemnation of Iraq’s actions and expressing equally firm support for Kuwait's sovereignty."
