= 2023 Arab League summit =

2023 Arab League meeting

2023 Arab League Summit
- Host country: Saudi Arabia
- Date: May 19, 2023
- Motto: Renewal and reform
- Cities: Jeddah
- Venues: Hotel Hilton
- Participants: 22 countries
- Chair: Mohammed bin Salman
- Follows: 2022 Arab League summit
- Precedes: 2024 Arab League summit

The 2023 Arab League summit, officially the 32nd Ordinary Session of the Council of the League of Arab States at the Summit Level, was a meeting of heads of state and government of member states of the League of Arab States that took place in Jeddah, Saudi Arabia, on 19 May 2023. All member states were represented at the meeting, including Syria, which returned after its membership was suspended in 2011.

== Background ==
Shortly after the conclusion of the Algiers Summit in November 2022, it was announced that the Arab League meeting at the summit level would be held in Saudi Arabia. The General Secretariat declared on 26 March 2023, following discussions with Saudi Arabia, that the Arab summit will take place on 19 May.

== Participants ==
On 7 May, the Arab foreign ministers agreed to return Syria to its seat in the organization. On 9 May, President Bashar Al-Assad received an invitation to attend the next summit from a Saudi envoy. One day before the opening of the summit, it was announced that Ukrainian President Volodymyr Zelenskyy would be its guest and deliver a speech.

Members
Country / Organization	Represented by	Title	Ref.
Arab League	Ahmed Aboul Gheit	Secretary-General	
Algeria	Aymen Benabderrahmane	Prime Minister	
Bahrain	Hamad bin Isa Al Khalifa	King	
Comoros	Kassem Lotfi	Minister of State	
Djibouti	Ismaïl Omar Guelleh	President	
Egypt	Abdel Fattah el-Sisi	President	
Iraq	Mohammed Shia' Al Sudani	Prime Minister	
Jordan	Abdullah II	King	
Kuwait	Mishal Al-Ahmad Al-Sabah	Crown Prince	
Lebanon	Najib Mikati	Prime Minister	
Libya	Mohamed al-Menfi	Chairman of the Presidential Council	
Mauritania	Mohamed Ould Ghazouani	President	
Morocco	Moulay Rachid	Special Representative of the King	
Oman	Asa'ad bin Tariq	Deputy Prime Minister	
Palestine	Mahmoud Abbas	President	
Qatar	Tamim bin Hamad Al Thani	Emir	
Saudi Arabia	Mohammed bin Salman	Crown Prince / Prime Minister	
Somalia	Hassan Sheikh Mohamud	President	
Sudan	Dafallah Al-Hajj	Deputy Minister of Foreign Affairs	
(Ba'athist Syria) Syria	Bashar al-Assad	President	
Tunisia	Kais Saied	President	
United Arab Emirates	Mansour bin Zayed Al Nahyan	Vice President	
Yemen	Rashad al-Alimi	Chairman of the Presidential Leadership Council	
Guests
Country / Organization	Represented by	Title	Ref.
African Union	Moussa Faki	Chair of the Commission	
Organisation of Islamic Cooperation	Hissein Brahim Taha	Secretary-General	
Ukraine	Volodymyr Zelenskyy	President	

== See also ==
- Ninth Extraordinary Session of the Islamic Summit Conference
- International reactions to the 2023 Israel–Hamas war
- Arab Islamic extraordinary summit 2023
