= 2023 Arab–Islamic extraordinary summit =

Meeting of Arab League on the Gaza war

Arab–Islamic extraordinary summit
- November 11, 2023
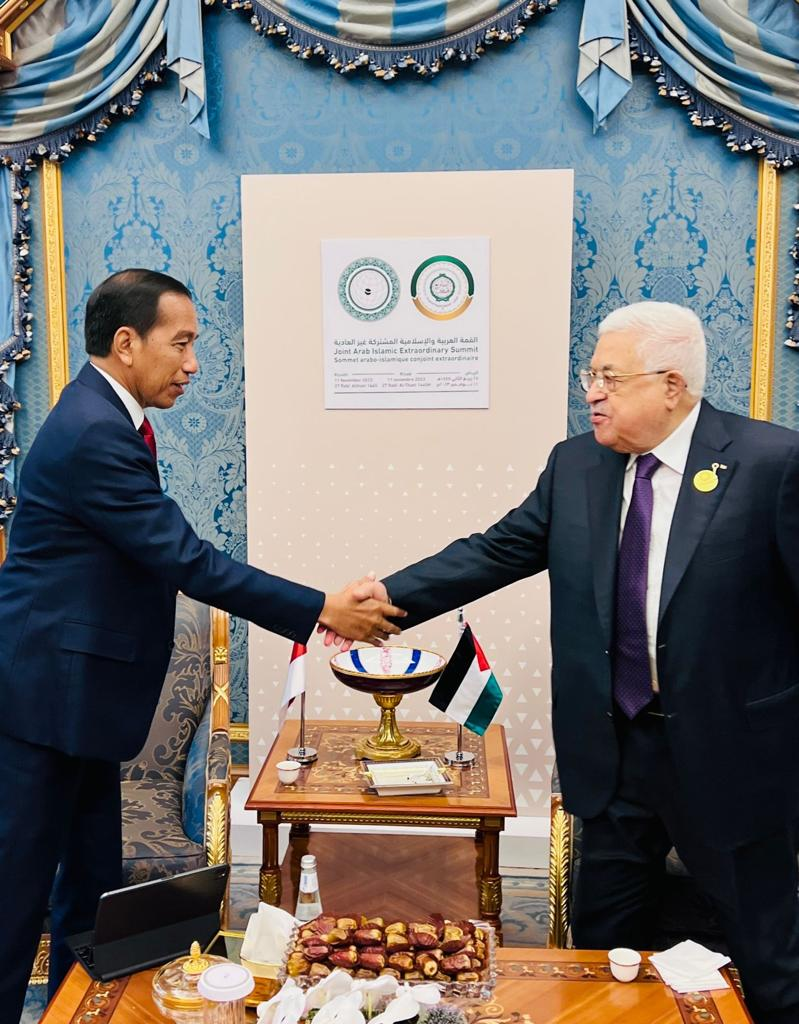
- Presidents Joko Widodo of Indonesia and Mahmoud Abbas of Palestine at a bilateral meeting during the summit
- Host country: Saudi Arabia
- Cities: Riyadh
- Venues: King Abdul Aziz International Conference Center, Riyadh

The 2023 Arab–Islamic extraordinary summit was organized between the Arab League and the Organization of Islamic Cooperation on 11 November 2023, in Riyadh, the capital of Saudi Arabia, chaired by Crown Prince and Prime Minister Mohammed bin Salman. The urgent meeting was prompted by the Gaza war.

The summit was widely criticized for its substandard outcomes and for repeating the same speeches and statements as previous summits. Algeria boycotted the meeting because its proposals were not adopted, and sent a low-level delegation.

== Background ==
On 7 October 2023, the paramilitary wing of Hamas led a series of attacks on Israel, resulting in significant loss of life. Israel responded to these attacks with heavy strikes on the Gaza Strip that resulted in the Gaza genocide.

== Objectives ==
The stated primary goal of this meeting was to tackle the ongoing crisis in Gaza and its neighboring regions, paying specific attention to the worsening conditions that endanger civilian lives and regional stability. The summit condemned "Israeli aggression on the Gaza Strip, war crimes and barbaric and inhumane massacres by the occupation government" and called for ending the blockade of Gaza, allowing humanitarian aid, and halting arms exports to Israel.

== See also ==
- 2023 Arab League summit
- Ninth Extraordinary Session of the Islamic Summit Conference
- International reactions to the Gaza war
- Gaza humanitarian crisis (2023–present)
