= 1990 Arab League summit (Baghdad) =

Meeting of Arab regional organization

Arab League Summit
- Host country: Iraq
- Date: 28–30 May
- Cities: Baghdad
- Participants: 19
- Chair: President Saddam Hussein
- Follows: 1989
- Precedes: 1990 (Cairo)

The 1990 Arab summit, officially Emergency Arab Summit Conference, was an extraordinary summit that includes the leaders of the member states of the Arab League, hosted by the Iraqi capital, Baghdad, between May 28 and 30, 1990.

It was held about two months before Iraq invaded Kuwait. It was called for by Iraqi President Saddam Hussein, but Syria and Lebanon were absent. The conferees warned of the wave of Jewish immigration from the Soviet Union, which was on the verge of disintegration, and considered it a threat to Arab national security and the rights of the Palestinians.

== Participants ==
Country	Represented by	Title
Bahrain	Isa bin Salman Al Khalifa	Emir
Iraq	Saddam Hussein	President
Kuwait	Jaber Al-Ahmad Al-Sabah	Emir
Libya	Muammar Gaddafi	Brotherly Leader and Guide of the Revolution
Mauritania	Maaouya Ould Sid'Ahmed Taya	President
Palestine	Yassir Arafat	President
Qatar	Khalifa bin Hamad Al Thani	Emir
Saudi Arabia	Fahd bin Abdulaziz Al Saud	King
United Arab Emirates	Zayed bin Sultan Al Nahyan	President
Yemen	Ali Abdullah Saleh	President
