= 2009 Arab League summit =

Meeting of Arab regional organization

Arab League 21st summit
- Host country: Qatar
- Date: 30–31 March 2009
- Cities: Doha
- Follows: 2010 Arab League summit
- Precedes: 2008 Arab League summit

The 2009 Arab League summit was held in Doha, Qatar on March 30, 2009. The Arab League defied the International Criminal Court by giving a "warm welcome" to Sudanese President Omar Hassan al-Bashir, whom the Court placed on warrant of arrest for war crimes in the Darfur genocide.

== Reactions ==
Egyptian President Hosni Mubarak boycotted the summit amid differences with Qatar stemming from the 2008–2009 Israel–Gaza conflict. Other Arab countries like Saudi Arabia were also hesitant to come to the summit if Iran or Hamas were in attendance (neither of the parties came while the Saudis did).

== Incidents ==
In a reference to an earlier incident between King Abdullah of Saudi Arabia and Libyan leader Muammar al-Gaddafi during a previous Arab League Summit six years prior, Gaddafi called King Abdullah of Saudi Arabia a liar, accusing him of "bringing the Americans to occupy Iraq" and of being "made by Britain and protected by the US.". Echoing Abdullah's remarks to him during the 2003 Arab League Summit at Sharm ash-Sheikh, Gaddafi told Abdullah that: "you have [nothing but] lies behind you and [only] your grave awaits you” (Arabic: الكِذِب إمَامَك والقِبِر قدامك). Finally, Gaddafi declared that: "I am an international leader, the dean of the Arab rulers, the king of kings of Africa and the imam (leader) of Muslims, and my international status does not allow me to descend to a lower level". He then invited the King to visit him to solve the issues between the two.
