= Arab Peace Initiative =

Proposal from the 2002 Beirut Arab League Summit

The Arab Peace Initiative (Arabic: مبادرة السلام العربية; Hebrew: יוזמת השלום הערבית), also known as the Saudi Initiative (Arabic: مبادرة السعودية; Hebrew: היוזמה הסעודית), is a 10-sentence proposal for an end to the Arab–Israeli conflict that was endorsed by the Arab League in 2002 at the Beirut Summit and re-endorsed at the 2007 and at the 2017 Arab League summits. The initiative offers normalisation of relations by the Arab world with Israel, in return for a full withdrawal by Israel from the occupied territories (including the West Bank, Gaza, the Golan Heights, and Lebanon), with the possibility of comparable and mutual agreed minor swaps of the land between Israel and Palestine, a "just settlement" of the Palestinian refugee problem based on UN Resolution 194, and the establishment of a Palestinian state with East Jerusalem as its capital.

The Palestinian Authority led by Yasser Arafat immediately embraced the initiative. His successor Mahmoud Abbas also supported the plan and officially asked U.S. president Barack Obama to adopt it as part of his Middle East policy. Initial reports indicate that Islamist political party Hamas, the elected government of the Gaza Strip, was deeply divided, while later reports indicate that Hamas accepted the peace initiative. The Israeli government under Ariel Sharon rejected the initiative as a "non-starter" because it required Israel to withdraw to pre-June 1967 borders. In 2015, Israeli prime minister Benjamin Netanyahu expressed tentative support for the Initiative, but in 2018, he rejected it as a basis for future negotiations with the Palestinians.

== The plan ==
=== Prelude to the 2002 Beirut summit ===
The Arab League summit held after the Six-Day War, during which Israel occupied large swathes of Arab territory, established the Khartoum Resolution on September 1, 1967. It contained the "three noes" that was to be the center of all Israeli-Arab relations after that point: No peace deals, no diplomatic recognitions, and no negotiations. UN Security Council Resolution 242, which called for normalization of Israel with the Arab states and for Israel to withdraw from territories taken during the war, was enacted on November 22, 1967, and faced initial rejection by most of the Arab world. The peace initiative marked a major shift from the 1967 position.

Like most peace plans since 1967, it was based on UN Security Council Resolution 242. It followed the July 2000 Middle East Peace Summit at Camp David which ended in failure and the al-Aqsa Intifada beginning in September 2000. In fall 2002, the Bush administration strenuously tried to push a temporary cease-fire in the intifada to give breathing room for the Beirut summit but failed to achieve an agreement. However, the presence of American negotiator Anthony Zinni in Israel led to a lull in the conflict for the two weeks before the summit. During this period, the Bush administration hoped to draw attention away from the Iraq disarmament crisis that would later escalate into the 2003 invasion of Iraq.

Some reporters were skeptical about the summit's prospects. Robert Fisk explained the absence of Egypt's Hosni Mubarak and Jordan's King Abdullah: "they can smell a dead rat from quite a long way away." On March 14, analyst Shai Feldman stated on The News Hour with Jim Lehrer that "[t]here's little hope that negotiations will pick up or that negotiations will eventually succeed in bringing about a negotiated outcome between the two sides." However, Pulitzer Prize-winning columnist Thomas Friedman met Saudi crown prince Abdullah in February 2002 and encouraged him to make the peace proposal.

=== 2002 summit ===
==== The declaration ====
Only ten of the twenty-two leaders invited to the March 27 Arab League summit in Beirut, Lebanon attended. The missing included Palestinian Authority Chairman Yasser Arafat, President Hosni Mubarak of Egypt, and King Abdullah of Jordan. Ariel Sharon's government, despite American and European pressure, had told Arafat that he would not be allowed to return if he left for the summit. The lack of participation led Australian Broadcasting Corporation reporter Tim Palmer to label the summit "emasculated".

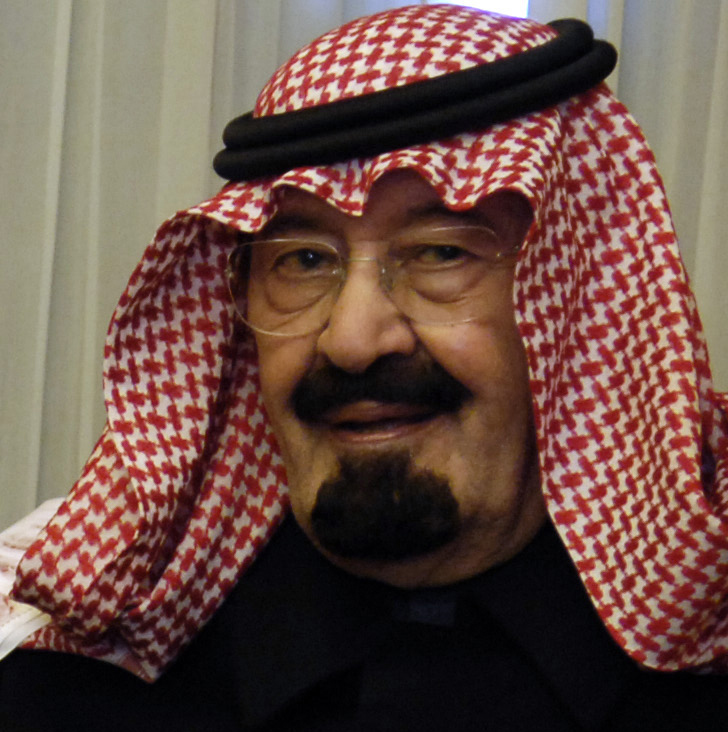
Abdullah, along with other members of the Saudi royal family, was outspoken in his support for the plan.

The Arab League members unanimously endorsed the peace initiative on March 27. It consists of a comprehensive proposal to end the entire Arab–Israeli conflict. It provides in relevant part:

(a) Complete withdrawal from the occupied Arab territories, including the Syrian Golan Heights, to the 4 June 1967 line and the territories still occupied in southern Lebanon; (b) Attain a just solution to the problem of Palestinian refugees to be agreed upon in accordance with the UN General Assembly Resolution No 194. (c) Accept the establishment of an independent and sovereign Palestinian state on the Palestinian territories occupied since 4 June 1967 in the West Bank and Gaza Strip with East Jerusalem as its capital. In return the Arab states will do the following: (a) Consider the Arab–Israeli conflict over, sign a peace agreement with Israel, and achieve peace for all states in the region; (b) Establish normal relations with Israel within the framework of this comprehensive peace.

Crown Prince Abdullah of Saudi Arabia made a speech to the Arab League on the day of its adoption saying that:

In spite of all that has happened and what still may happen, the primary issue in the heart and mind of every person in our Arab Islamic nation is the restoration of legitimate rights in Palestine, Syria and Lebanon.... We believe in taking up arms in self-defence and to deter aggression. But we also believe in peace when it is based on justice and equity, and when it brings an end to conflict. Only within the context of true peace can normal relations flourish between the people of the region and allow the region to pursue development rather than war. In light of the above, and with your backing and that of the Almighty, I propose that the Arab summit put forward a clear and unanimous initiative addressed to the United Nations security council based on two basic issues: normal relations and security for Israel in exchange for full withdrawal from all occupied Arab territories, recognition of an independent Palestinian state with al-Quds al-Sharif as its capital, and the return of refugees.

The initiative refers to United Nations General Assembly Resolution 194, which emphasizes the return of Palestinian refugees to Israel. In a compromise wording, it states that the League supports any negotiated settlement between Israel and Palestinians and does not mention the term "right of return".

==== Resistance to the summit ====
Although the Initiative was adopted unanimously, there was some debate on certain issues. The summit leaders faced stiff opposition from the government of Syria, which insisted on letting the Palestinians pursue armed resistance. It also objected to the use of the term "normalization" and insisted that any such offer was too generous to Israel. The government of Lebanon expressed concerns that some of its Palestinian refugees would try to settle where they are, which it strongly opposes.

==== Passover massacre ====
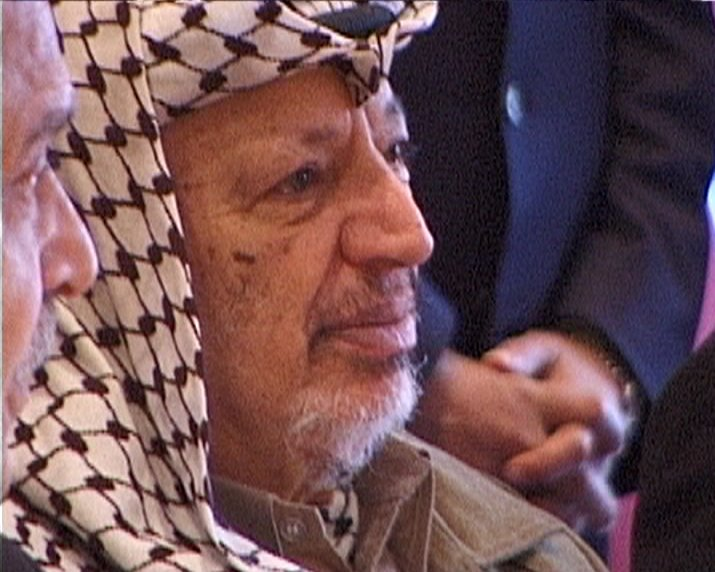
Despite his support for the plan, Israeli officials blamed Arafat for failing to stop the second Intifada's violence during the summit.

A suicide bomber killed 30 Israelis in Netanya the same day the Initiative was launched. Hamas claimed responsibility for the attack and its leader Sheikh Ahmed Yassin said that the attack sent "a message to the Arab summit to confirm that the Palestinian people continue to struggle for the land and to defend themselves no matter what measures the enemy takes." The Arab League said that it did not think that the perpetrators planned the bombing to derail the Beirut summit.

The Palestinian Authority condemned the attack and Arafat personally ordered the arrests of militants associated with Hamas, Islamic Jihad, and the Al Aqsa Martyrs Brigades as a response. However, Ariel Sharon blamed Arafat for the attack as well.

An Israeli government spokesperson stated that "[t]here ain't going to be any negotiations under fire". Another government spokesperson, Raanan Gissin, said that Israel would continue to pursue the cease-fire but that "when we will feel that we have exhausted all the possibilities of achieving such a cease-fire, then of course we will take all the necessary measures in order to defend our citizens."

The Passover Massacre as well as other attacks led to an escalation of the al-Aqsa Intifada and helped falter the initiative. The violence led the United Nations Security Council to issue a unanimous resolution on March 30, Resolution 1402, which criticized all sides:

Expressing its grave concern at the further deterioration of the situation, including the recent suicide bombings in Israel and the military attack against the headquarters of the president of the Palestinian Authority, 1. Calls upon both parties to move immediately to a meaningful ceasefire; calls for the withdrawal of Israeli troops from Palestinian cities, including Ramallah; and calls upon the parties to cooperate fully with Special Envoy Zinni, and others, to implement the Tenet security work plan as a first step towards implementation of the Mitchell Committee recommendations, with the aim of resuming negotiations on a political settlement

=== Re-adoption at the 2007 Riyadh summit ===
With the exception of Libya, all leaders from the Arab League's 22 member states attended the two-day summit in Riyadh, the capital of Saudi Arabia, from March 28, to March 29, 2007. The initiative was fully re-endorsed by all members but the delegate from Hamas, then-Palestinian Prime Minister Ismail Haniyeh, abstained. In contrast, Palestinian Authority Chairman Mahmoud Abbas voted in favor. The initiative itself was left unchanged during its re-adoption. Until the eve of the summit, members had refused to consider altering any part of it. Arab League head Amr Moussa stated that the Israel-Palestinian conflict was at a crossroads where "either we move towards a real peace or see an escalation in the situation".

During the summit, King Abdullah denounced the United States-led occupation of Iraq; his comments may have been in response to a statement by U.S. secretary of state Condoleezza Rice asking the Arab world to "begin reaching out to Israel". He also called on the Israeli blockade of Gaza to end, saying that "It has become necessary to end the unjust blockade imposed on the Palestinian people as soon as possible so that the peace process can move in an atmosphere far from oppression and force." The American and Israel governments had been heavily pushing the Arab states to cut their support for Hamas before the summit began.

United Nations Secretary General Ban Ki-moon attended the summit, saying "the Arab peace initiative is one of the pillars of the peace process... [it] sends a signal that the Arabs are serious about achieving peace." European Union foreign policy leader Javier Solana observed the proceedings and expressed the EU's support for the decision, saying that "[f]ailure to rise to today's challenges will put the Middle East risk of missing the train of human and economic development". He also emphasized that the initiative served as a proposal up for further negotiations rather than a take-it-or-leave-it ultimatum for both sides.

PLO negotiations chief Saeb Erekat refused to accept anything other than the summit's draft and ruled out any negotiations that could alter it. In contrast, Saudi foreign minister Saudi al-Faisal said that members have "to take notice of new developments, which require additions and developments in whatever is offered".

=== Implementation ===
The initiative calls for the establishment of a special committee composed of a portion of the Arab League's concerned member states and the secretary general of the League of Arab States to pursue the necessary contacts to gain support for the initiative at all levels, particularly from the United Nations, the United Nations Security Council, the United States of America, the Russian Federation, the Muslim states and the European Union. This special commission would also consist of delegations from both Egypt and Jordan on behalf of the Arab world.

== Reactions ==
=== U.S. reactions ===
Initially, the initiative was met with enthusiastic support from the Bush administration. According to Bush's spokesperson Ari Fleischer "the president praised the crown prince's ideas regarding the full Arab-Israeli normalization once a comprehensive peace agreement has been reached." Though the president later stressed that it could only be implemented with the cessation of terrorist attacks against Israel.

His successor, Barack Obama expressed praise in the spirit, but not support of its details, for the Initiative in the first days of his presidency. In an interview with Al-Arabiya network on January 27, 2009, he said:

Look at the proposal that was put forth by King Abdullah of Saudi Arabia. I might not agree with every aspect of the proposal, but it took great courage to put forward something that is as significant as that. I think that there are ideas across the region of how we might pursue peace.

George Mitchell, then the United States special envoy to the Middle East, announced in March 2009 that President Barack Obama's administration intends to "incorporate" the initiative into its Middle East policy.

=== Israeli reactions ===
Israeli officials have made many different responses ranging from positive, to neutral, to negative. When the plan came out in 2002, the Israeli government rejected the initiative, on the grounds that it would result in the return of a large number of Palestinian refugees into Israel. Israel expressed reservations on "red line" issues on which it stated that it would not compromise.

Oslo Agreement negotiator Joel Singer commented shortly after the Beirut Summit that "the major problem with it is that it only called upon Israel to do a series of things and there was no call upon the Palestinians to stop terrorism."

BBC News stated that the 2007 re-adoption prompted a more supportive response from the government than the initial 2002 initiative, which ended up being "rejected... outright after it was first proposed". Shimon Peres in a meeting with Arab leaders at the World Economic Forum in Jordan in May 2007 said that his government would mount a counter-proposal. An Israeli Foreign Ministry spokesman said that "Israel has no interest in stagnation and unfortunately, if the Arab initiative is take it or leave it, that will be a recipe for stagnation". In October 2008, it was reported that the Israeli government were considering the Saudi offer and Defense Minister Ehud Barak again suggested a counter-proposal. But so far, no Israeli government has made any formal counter-proposal.

In terms of public opinion, the Oxford Research Group has reported that attitudes range "between those who have never heard of it, and those who don't believe a word of it." A November–December 2008 poll by the Palestinian Center for Policy and Survey Research in Ramallah and the Harry S. Truman Research Institute for the Advancement of Peace in Jerusalem found that only 36% of Israelis support the plan. A June 2008 Angus Reid Global Monitor poll found that about 67% of Palestinians and 39% of Israelis support it.

==== Benjamin Netanyahu ====
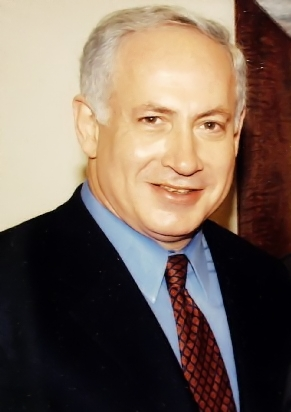
Israeli Prime Minister Benjamin Netanyahu believes "the general idea — to try and reach understandings with leading Arab countries — is a good idea," noting also that "the situation in the Middle East has changed since it was first proposed."

In 2007 Benjamin Netanyahu who in 2009 would for the second time become Prime Minister of Israel rejected the Initiative. He told visiting Arab foreign ministers that "The withdrawal from Gaza two years ago proved that any Israeli withdrawal – particularly a unilateral one – does not advance peace, but rather establishes a terror base for radical Islam." In 2015 he elaborated: "there are positive aspects and negative aspects to it [the initiative]." While noting that the situation has changed in the 13 years since the deal was proposed, he asserted that "the general idea – to try and reach understandings with leading Arab countries – is a good idea." However, he objected to the Initiative's calls for Israel to withdraw from the Golan Heights and to repatriate Palestinian refugees.

In 2018, Netanyahu rejected the Arab Peace Initiative as a basis for negotiations with the Palestinians.

==== Shimon Peres ====
On March 28, 2002, then Foreign Minister Shimon Peres said:

Israel views positively every initiative aimed at arriving at peace and normalization. In this respect, the Saudi step is an important one, but it is liable to founder if terrorism is not stopped. We cannot, of course, ignore the problematic aspects which arose at the Beirut Summit and the harsh and rejectionist [sic] language used by some of the speakers. It is also clear that the details of every peace plan must be discussed directly between Israel and the Palestinians, and to make this possible, the Palestinian Authority must put an end to terror, the horrifying expression of which we witnessed just last night in Netanya.

On November 12, 2008, Peres reiterated his support for the initiative at the UN General Assembly Meeting on Inter-Faith Dialogue:

The Arab peace initiative states that: 'A military solution to the conflict will not achieve peace or provide security for the parties.' Israel agrees with that assumption. Further on, the initiative states that: 'A just and comprehensive peace in the Middle East is the strategic option of the Arab countries.' This is Israel's strategy as well. It continues that its goals are to: '...consider the Arab–Israeli conflict ended, and enter into a peace agreement with Israel, and provide security for all the states in the region. Establish normal relations with Israel in the context of comprehensive peace. Stop the further shedding of blood, enabling the Arab countries and Israel to live in peace and good neighborliness, and provide future generations with security, stability and prosperity.' These expressions in the Arab peace initiative are inspirational and promising – a serious opening for real progress.

At the 2009 American Israel Public Affairs Committee (AIPAC) policy conference, President Shimon Peres expressed satisfaction at the "u-turn" in the attitudes of Arab states toward peace with Israel as reflected in the Saudi initiative, though he did qualify his comments by saying: "Israel wasn't a partner to the wording of this initiative. Therefore it doesn't have to agree to every word."

"Nevertheless, Israel respects the profound change, and hopes it will be translated into action," Peres added. "I trust that the leadership of President Obama will pave the way to both to a regional agreement and meaningful bilateral negotiations."

"Israel stands with her arms outstretched, and her hands held open to peace with all nations, with all Arab states, with all Arab people." the president declared.

"To those still holding a clenched fist I have just one word to say: Enough. Enough war. Enough destruction. Enough hatred. Now is the time for change," said Peres. "Israel is prepared today to bring peace closer. Today."

==== Other Israeli statements ====
Israeli Foreign Minister and Deputy Prime Minister Avigdor Lieberman said on April 21, 2009, that the plan is "a dangerous proposal, a recipe for the destruction of Israel."

Likud party spokesperson Zalman Shoval said in March 2007 that Israel would never accept the return of refugees who had lived in pre-1967 Israeli territory, saying "If 300,000–400,000, or maybe a million, Palestinians would invade the country, that would be the end of the state of Israel as a Jewish state.... That's not why we created the state." Prime Minister Ehud Olmert also stated that month that "I'll never accept a solution that is based on their return to Israel, any number.... I will not agree to accept any kind of Israel responsibility for the refugees. Full stop.... It's a moral issue of the highest level. I don't think that we should accept any kind of responsibility for the creation of this problem." In general, however, Olmert has described the initiative as a "revolutionary change".

The day before, the Israeli consul general in New York City had said:

Look, the Saudi idea has a lot of positive elements in it, which is why we have never dismissed it at face value.... Quite the contrary, we said we will endorse and enter a dialogue with the Saudis or anyone else – indeed in the entire Arab world – if they are serious on the normalization issue. The thing is, that life in the Middle East has taught us to be extremely skeptical and extremely wary of these kind of declarations until they are actually delivered in the Arabic language.

Yossi Alpher, a political consultant and writer and former senior advisor to Israeli Prime Minister Ehud Barak, said in November 2008 that: "The initiative is unique in terms of the comprehensive “payoff” it offers Israel and, with regard to refugees, both the absence of any direct mention of the right of return and the recognition that Israel's agreement to a solution must be solicited. It represents huge progress from the days in 1967".

American-Israeli journalist Caroline B. Glick, editor of the English-language Jerusalem Post, said in March 2007 that "there is no chance whatsoever that the Saudi initiative will bring peace" and labeled it "a recipe for Israel's destruction". Kadima Chairperson Tzipi Livni has distanced herself from it given her uncompromising opposition to the return of the Palestinian refugees. In October 2008, Likud Knesset Member Yuval Steinitz, who served on the Foreign Affairs and Defense Committee, referred to the 2007 initiative re-launch as a nonstarter and called then Defense Minister Ehud Barak's supportive remarks "an empty political gesture." In a recent study by Joshua Teitelbaum, for the Jerusalem Center for Public Affairs, he calls on Israel to reject the plan based on its "all or nothing" attitude, emphasizing that true peace will come with negotiations.

=== Palestinian reactions ===
Polls of the Palestinian people have generated large support for the plan. Support decreased slightly after the 2008-09 Gaza War. However, in March 2009 the majority was still in favor.

==== Palestinian Authority ====
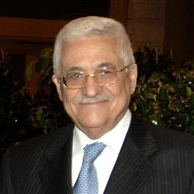
Mahmoud Abbas said the initiative could create "a sea of peace that begins in Nouakchott and ends in Indonesia".

The Arab Peace Plan has received the full support of Mahmoud Abbas and the Palestinian Authority, which even took the unprecedented step of placing advertisements in Israeli newspapers on November 20, 2008, to promote it. The Palestinian Authority published full-page notices in Hebrew in four major Israeli daily newspapers, which reproduced the text of the Initiative in full and added that "Fifty-seven Arab and Islamic countries will establish diplomatic ties and normal relations with Israel in return for a full peace agreement and an end to the occupation." A November–December poll by the Palestinian Center for Policy and Survey Research in Ramallah and the Harry S. Truman Research Institute for the Advancement of Peace in Jerusalem found that only 25% of Israelis saw the ads and only 14% actually read them.

Peace Now reciprocated the PLO's gesture by running its own ads in the Palestinian press. After the 2007 summit, Mahmoud Abbas said that "This initiative simply says to Israel 'leave the occupied territories and you will live in a sea of peace that begins in Nouakchott and ends in Indonesia'". Palestinian negotiator Saeb Erekat has offered his full support of the Arab Peace Initiative, and has urged Israel to support it on several occasions. Most recently, in an October 19, 2008, statement, Erekat said that "I think Israel should have [supported the Initiative] since 2002. It is the most strategic initiative that came from the Arab world since 1948.... I urge them to revisit this initiative and to go with it because it will shorten the way to peace."

In August and September 2020, the Palestinian Authority and Hamas criticised the Israel–United Arab Emirates normalization agreement and another with Bahrain, describing them as "a betrayal" of the Palestinian cause, and a weaken of the Arab Peace Initiative.

==== Hamas ====
From its inception in 2002, the Initiative deeply divided the organization. While some leaders have spoken positively about it, others didn't accept the Initiative, which alienated Jordan and Egypt. Some later reports that Hamas accepted the initiative. By 2006, Hamas would sign agreements with Fatah that would agree to the 1967 borders as a basis for a Palestinian state, and by 2017 Hamas published a new charter that accepted a Palestinian state on the 1967 borders.

Hamas' spokesman Ismail Abu Shanab told The San Francisco Chronicle in April 2002 that the organization would accept it, saying "That would be satisfactory for all Palestinian military groups to stop and build our state, to be busy in our own affairs, and have good neighborhood with Israelis." The reporters who interviewed Shanab asked if he was speaking for the entire Hamas organization and Shanab answered "Yes." They then tried to contact other Hamas leaders to confirm Shanab's remarks, but they could either not be reached or were unwilling to comment on the matter.

One of Palestinian Authority President Mahmoud Abbas' conditions of forming a national coalition government with Hamas after the 2006 election was that Hamas had to recognize the Initiative, but he was unsuccessful. Hamas' foreign minister Mahmoud al-Zahar said in June 2006 that the organization rejects the initiative. Prime Minister Ismail Haniyeh said in October 2006 that the "problem with the Arab peace initiative is that it includes recognition of the state of Israel, the thing that the Palestinian government rejects" and dismissed it. That month, Mahmoud al-Zahar declared unequivocally: "Hamas will never change its position regardless of the pressure's intensity" and "We will never recognize the Arab initiative." In January 2007, Hamas leader Khaled Meshaal said in an interview that Hamas supports "the Arab position," presumably referring to the Arab Peace Initiative.

After the revival of the initiative in March 2007, Hamas continued a policy of ambiguity with many officials giving mixed responses. Hamas spokesman Fawzi Barhum told Haaretz that "the issue is not a 'yes' or 'no' by Hamas regarding the initiative. We respect the Arab efforts to attain Palestinian rights and we will act within the Arab consensus. Nonetheless, the Zionist enemy continues to reject the initiative and we will not determine our position in reference to it before it has been accepted." Haaretz sources in Palestine state that Hamas wanted to oppose the initiative outright but did not do so because it did not want to break with the Saudi Arabian government.

In November 2008, PLO Negotiations Affairs Department published ads promoting the Arab Peace Initiative in Israeli dailies. Meshaal in response stated that "The rights of Palestinians can be achieved only through resistance, not advertisements." However, in an interview with BBC's Jeremy Bowen in April 2008, Meshaal threw his support behind the initiative.

Time stated in January 2009 that "In the Arab world, only Hamas and Hizballah, with the backing of Tehran, reject the Arab peace initiative." Left-wing Israeli commentator and former minister of justice Yossi Beilin also said in January 2009 that "Hamas considers its adherence to the three "nos" of Khartoum from 1967, which the entire Arab world abandoned in adopting the Arab peace initiative, to be its primary distinctive feature Fateh. Even a prolonged battering by the IDF will not bring Hamas to make this change." The Khaleej Times editorialized in December 2008 that "The Arab peace plan remains the best and most pragmatic solution to Palestine-Israel conflict.... Even though Hamas and Islamic Jihad are not prepared to accept anything short of the entire Palestine occupied in 1940s, if the plan is accepted by Israel and US, the Arabs could possibly persuade Islamists to embrace it too."

In May 2017, Hamas updated its covenant, expressing a willingness to accept a Palestinian state within the 1967 borders. However, it maintained its stance on several key issues: it did not abandon its commitment to resistance and the military option against Israel to achieve a Palestinian state, insisted on the right of return for the 1948 Palestinian refugees and the 1967 displaced to all Palestinian territories, and continued to view jihad, as a legitimate and strategic option for defending and reclaiming Palestinian rights.

=== Arab reactions ===
Many Arab policy makers, chiefs of state, and commentators have written in support of the initiative since 2002. Turki al-Faisal, Saudi minister of foreign affairs, wrote in The Washington Post in support shortly after Barack Obama's 2008 election victory. al-Faisal stated that "there are reasons to be optimistic" and "best medicine yet formulated for the Israeli-Palestinian dispute is the Arab peace initiative". He also called the plan "a high price for peace" from the Arab perspective.

Marwan Muasher, formerly Jordanian foreign minister and the first Jordanian ambassador to Israel, wrote in Haaretz on August 19, 2008, that:

Six years ago, the Arab League took a bold step in the pursuit of a comprehensive and lasting peace in our region. At the Beirut Arab League Summit in 2002, 22 states unanimously adopted the Arab Peace Initiative – a historic document that offered a formula for ending not only the Palestinian-Israeli conflict, but also the wider, lingering Arab–Israeli conflict, and to achieve a collective peace, security for all and normal relations with Israel. The initiative was the embodiment of the moderate camp in the Arab world and of its leap of faith in addressing both Arab and Israeli needs. Unfortunately, the Arab Peace Initiative was not related to seriously by the two players whose support and endorsement were crucial for its implementation: Neither Israel nor the United States responded with more than lip service. Arab states are also to be blamed for failing to explain the initiative to the Israeli public, our principal audience.

In addition, the six members of the Gulf Cooperation Council expressed their support of the Initiative on May 20 during a consultative meeting that was held in Dammam.

Support for the Arab Peace Plan was also expressed by Andre Azoulay, a Jewish adviser to Moroccan King Mohammed VI. On October 28, 2008, Mr Azoulay said at a conference in Tel Aviv that: "I am a Jew with a commitment," said Andre Azoulay. "I'm an Arab Jew. I advise the king of Morocco... The Arab mainstream sees Israel as the party responsible for preventing peace, not the Arabs.... [The Peace Plan] is something that the Israelis hoped for ten years ago. But who knows about it in Israel today? Who will take the initiative and explain it? The momentum will not last forever. This is a dangerous situation. Tomorrow something could happen in the West Bank and blow the whole deal, and we'll have to wait again."

Mohammad Raad, head of Hezbollah's bloc in the Lebanese parliament, condemned the peace plan, saying that "[t]his option cannot be promoted in the Arab and Islamic worlds anymore". Hezbollah leader Sheikh Naim Qassem also made similar remarks.

In June 2009, Egyptian President Hosni Mubarak repeated his support for the peace plan. He also stated that it does not mean recognizing Israel's right to exist as a Jewish state, since that would imply giving up the right of return. Lebanese President Michel Suleiman also made similar statements and he called on the international community to push Israel towards accepting the peace plan. Both leaders had responded to an address by Israeli Prime Minister Netanyahu.

=== International reactions ===
Outside of the Middle East, the Arab Peace Initiative has received praise of chiefs of state throughout the world, international organisations, and a large number of political commentators specializing in the Israeli/Palestinian conflict.

Ban Ki-moon, the secretary general of the United Nations, has led this chorus of support on a number of occasions. In his address to the Summit of the League of Arab States on March 28, 2007, he said:

The Arab Peace Initiative is one of the pillars of the peace process. Endorsed in the Road Map, the Initiative sends a clear signal that the Arab world, too, craves peace. When I was in Israel, I urged my Israeli friends to take a fresh look at the Arab Peace Initiative. Here in Riyadh, I urge you, my Arab friends, to use this Summit to reaffirm your commitment to the Initiative. ... At the same time, the Quartet has been re-energized and the Arab Peace Initiative suggests a new way forward for the region.

The Arab Peace Initiative was endorsed by the Quartet on the Middle East on April 30, 2003, and recognized its importance in the Road Map. A joint statement issued by the Quartet on May 30, 2007, provides that:

The Quartet welcomed the re-affirmation of the Arab Peace Initiative, noting that the initiative is recognized in the Roadmap as a vital element of international efforts to advance regional peace. The Arab Peace Initiative provides a welcome regional political horizon for Israel, complementing the efforts of the Quartet and of the parties themselves to advance towards negotiated, comprehensive, just and lasting peace. The Quartet noted its positive meeting with members of the Arab League in Sharm al-Sheikh on May 4, and looked forward to continued engagement with the Arab states. It welcomed the intention of the Arab League to engage Israel on the initiative, and Israeli receptiveness to such engagement.

The prime minister of the United Kingdom Gordon Brown also voiced support for the Initiative during a press conference that was held on December 15, 2008, at the London Business Forum on Trade and Investment with Palestine, Downing Street. The prime minister said:

I think it is important to recognise that the Arab Peace Initiative, the 22 Arab States calling on President-elect Obama to prioritise the achieving of a comprehensive plan, is a very important development indeed. It is the 22 Arab countries coming behind progress that can happen quickly in their view. Asking the new Presidency in America to take this as an urgent priority, and we are very much of the same view and we will do our best to promote that initiative.

The UK foreign minister David Miliband reiterated that support on November 24, 2008. In a speech delivered on that day in Abu Dhabi at the Emirates Centre for Strategic Studies and Research, he said that:

[W]hen the Arab Peace Initiative was launched in 2002 it was simply not given the attention it deserved. It was – and still is – one of the most significant and promising developments since the start of the conflict. My belief is that the time has come to build on this initiative and ensure Arab leaders are part of a renewed comprehensive peace process – active participants with interests and responsibilities, not substituting for Israeli and Palestinian negotiators, but not passive spectators either.

All of the 57 states of the Organisation of Islamic Cooperation (formerly the Organisation of the Islamic Conference) have expressed their support for the Arab Peace Initiative. The members of the Organisation re-affirm their support at almost each of their session (including, for example, the 33rd Session of the Islamic Conference of Foreign Ministers Session of Harmony of Rights, Freedoms and Justice, which took place on June 19–21, 2006 in Baku, Azerbaijan).

AIPAC opposed the initiative, and referred to it as an "ultimatum".

=== Support from Middle East analysts ===
The Initiative has also obtained the support of a large number of leading commentators on Middle East issues. On April 9, 2007, Noam Chomsky, offered the following thoughts shortly after the Beirut Declaration was readopted by the League of Arab States:

The Arab League plan goes beyond earlier versions of the international consensus by calling for full normalization of relations with Israel. By now, the US and Israel can't simply ignore it, because US relations with Saudi Arabia are too tenuous, and because of the catastrophic effects of the Iraq invasion (and the great regional concern that the US will go on to attack Iran, very strongly opposed in the region, apart from Israel). So therefore the US and Israel are departing slightly from their extreme unilateral rejectionism, at least in rhetoric, though not in substance.

Shortly before the Beirut Declaration was to be readopted by the Arab League in 2007, Thomas Friedman wrote in The New York Times that:

What the moribund Israeli-Palestinian talks need most today is an emotional breakthrough. Another Arab declaration, just reaffirming the Abdullah initiative, won't cut it. If King Abdullah wants to lead – and he has the integrity and credibility to do so – he needs to fly from the Riyadh summit to Jerusalem and deliver the offer personally to the Israeli people. That is what Egypt's Anwar Sadat did when he forged his breakthrough. If King Abdullah did the same, he could end this conflict once and for all. I would humbly suggest the Saudi king make four stops. His first stop should be to Al Aksa Mosque in East Jerusalem, the third holiest site in Islam. There, he, the custodian of Mecca and Medina, could reaffirm the Muslim claim to Arab East Jerusalem by praying at Al Aksa. From there, he could travel to Ramallah and address the Palestinian parliament, making clear that the Abdullah initiative aims to give Palestinians the leverage to offer Israel peace with the whole Arab world in return for full withdrawal. And he might add that whatever deal the Palestinians cut with Israel regarding return of refugees or land swaps – so some settlements might stay in the West Bank in return for the Palestinians getting pieces of Israel – the Arab world would support. From there, King Abdullah could helicopter to Yad Vashem, the memorial to the six million Jews killed in the Holocaust. A visit there would seal the deal with Israelis and affirm that the Muslim world rejects the Holocaust denialism of Iran. Then he could go to the Israeli parliament and formally deliver his peace initiative.

On November 21, 2008, Brent Scowcroft and Zbigniew Brzezinski wrote in an article in The Washington Post that they also supported key parts of the Initiative, while adding conditions that until now have been rejected by the Arab states that sponsored it when they said:

The major elements of an agreement are well known. A key element in any new initiative would be for the U.S. president to declare publicly what, in the view of this country, the basic parameters of a fair and enduring peace ought to be. These should contain four principal elements: 1967 borders, with minor, reciprocal and agreed-upon modifications; compensation in lieu of the right of return for Palestinian refugees; Jerusalem as real home to two capitals; and a nonmilitarized Palestinian state. Something more might be needed to deal with Israeli security concerns about turning over territory to a Palestinian government incapable of securing Israel against terrorist activity. That could be dealt with by deploying an international peacekeeping force, such as one from NATO, which could not only replace Israeli security but train Palestinian troops to become effective.

Henry Siegman, former senior fellow and director of the U.S./Middle East Project (USMEP) at the Council on Foreign Relations and former executive director of the American Jewish Congress, wrote in the Financial Times on April 26, 2007, that:

The Arab League meeting in Cairo yesterday was unprecedented in its overture to Israel, offering to meet Israeli representatives to clarify the peace initiative that the League re-endorsed at its meeting in Riyadh on March 28. The two events underscore the complete reversal of the paradigm that for so long has defined the Israeli-Arab conflict.... The Israeli response to this tectonic change in Arab psychology and politics was worse than rejection: it was complete indifference, as if this 180-degree turnround in Arab thinking had no meaning for Israel and its future in the region. Ehud Olmert, prime minister, and his government have reflexively rejected every Arab peace offer, whether from Saudi Arabia, Syria, the Arab League or Mahmoud Abbas, the Palestinian president. Ariel Sharon's and Mr Olmert's policies these past seven years have shaped a new paradigm in which Israel is the rejectionist party. The Three Nos of Khartoum have been replaced by the Three Nos of Jerusalem: no negotiations with Syria, no acceptance of the Arab initiative and, above all, no peace talks with the Palestinians.

Ian Black, The Guardian's Middle East Editor, wrote on October 18, 2008, that:

It was common ground that part of the problem is that the Arab initiative was overshadowed by the worst incident of the second intifada – when a Palestinian suicide bomber killed 30 Israelis at their Passover meal on the eve of the Beirut summit – and Israel reoccupied most of the West Bank. The plan generated headlines when it was re-endorsed, again under Saudi auspices, at the Riyadh Arab summit last year. But thanks to Israeli objections it did not get a mention when Bush convened the Annapolis conference a few months later. The Annapolis goal of Israeli-Palestinian agreement by the end of his presidency looks like a bad joke. Ignorance is part of the problem. As someone quipped: you can wake an Israeli of a certain age at 3 am, say the word "Khartoum" and he will immediately identify the post-1967 war Arab summit in the Sudanese capital that produced three notorious "noes" – no peace, no recognition, no negotiations with Israel (which set the Arab consensus, broken only by Egypt, for the next 20 years). But the Saudi plan, which says exactly the opposite, is still likely to produce blank stares at any time. Ehud Olmert, Israel's outgoing prime minister, misrepresented the Arab initiative as a take-it-or-leave-it diktat, claiming it required the return of millions of Palestinian refugees – a red line for the any Israeli government – when it in fact talks sensibly of reaching "a just solution". Nor does it preclude negotiating land swaps, for example, so that Palestinians would get territory to compensate them for areas where post-1967 Israeli settlements cannot be moved.

Jonathan Freedland, also from The Guardian, wrote on December 17, 2008, that:

There are problems with the Arab plan. For one thing, there has been no public diplomacy for it, no public face for it – no equivalent of Anwar Sadat's breakthrough visit to Israel, proving the sincerity of his desire for peace. And how would it work in practice? [...] And yet the logic behind it is compelling. Right now, the Palestinians don't have enough to offer Israel to make the sacrifices required for a peace deal worthwhile. But an accord with the entire Arab world, that would be a prize worth bending for. And, while today's Palestinian leadership is too weak to make compromises on, for instance, Jerusalem, united Arab support would give the Palestinians all the cover they need.

On the day that the Arab Peace Initiative was to be readopted by the Arab League in 2007, Donald Macintyre wrote in The Independent that:

The Beirut declaration in favour of a two-state solution to the conflict marked a historic departure, even by the most hardline states. But it came at the bloody peak of the intifada and it was ignored by the US and rejected by the Israeli government of Ariel Sharon. The atmosphere now is very different. Not only has the US Secretary of State Condoleezza Rice said warm words about the initiative, but the Israeli Prime Minister Ehud Olmert has gone out of his way publicly to stress that it has "positive elements". More, the US – at least in the person of Dr Rice – has become diplomatically engaged in the conflict in a way that her predecessor Colin Powell was never able, or allowed, to do. Having visited Jerusalem and Ramallah four times in the past four months, she has spoken openly about the need for the Palestinians – in return for guaranteeing Israel's security – to have a "political horizon".

The Oxford Research Group organised a meeting in October 2008 that was attended by senior policy makers and analysts in order to discuss the Arab Peace Initiative. A report was published in November 2008 in order to summarize the meeting's findings, which included the following:

[T]he API [is] a remarkable and historic document, effectively reversing the three "noes" of the 1967 Khartoum Arab Summit (no peace, no recognition, no negotiation with Israel). It is the only regional peace proposal on offer and is widely regarded as the "only show in town" that encompasses the three sets of bilateral negotiations (with Palestinians, Syria, Lebanon) within a comprehensive multilateral framework. It has been reaffirmed most recently at the Damascus summit in 2008. The consensus was that the API offers the outline of an agreement that is very much in the strategic interest of Israel. It was seen as a deal that the founders of the State of Israel would surely have embraced with characteristic boldness, and negotiated with vigour. Participants agreed that there is no alternative framework that does or can effectively guarantee the future of a Jewish democratic state on 78% of mandate Palestine within a context of regional recognition and cooperation.

On March 26, 2012, on the eve of the 10th anniversary of the proposal, Haaretz's Akiva Eldar wrote that Israel's failure to respond adequately to the Arab proposal was part of the country's "worst missed opportunity".

=== Right of return ===
The Arab Peace Initiative, which was ratified at the summit of Arab leaders in Beirut in March 2002, presented principles for an agreement in the Israeli-Arab conflict, and included reference to the Palestinian refugee problem. The relevant passage in its decisions on this matter determined: "To accept to find an agreed, just solution to the problem of Palestinian refugees in conformity with Resolution 194," and "the rejection of all forms of Palestinian patriation which conflict with the special circumstances of the Arab host countries."

The Jerusalem Center for Public Affairs say that, by rejecting "patriation" (tawtin in Arabic) or the resettlement of the refugees in any Arab state, the Arab Peace Initiative essentially leaves each refugee with no choice but to go to Israel itself, According to this same institute, the Arab states used even more explicit language on this point in a Final Statement that accompanied their initiative, and the Initiative rejected any solution that involves "resettling of the Palestinians outside of their homes." What this means, in the opinion of the Jerusalem Center for Public Affairs, is that the Arab Peace Initiative opposes keeping any Palestinian refugee population in Lebanon, Syria, or Jordan; it also does not envision the Palestinian refugees being resettled in a West Bank and Gaza Palestinian state.

== Current status ==
Jordan and Egypt were appointed by the Arab League as its representatives to meet with Israeli leaders to promote the Initiative. These countries were chosen because Egypt and Jordan are the only Arab countries that have diplomatic relations with Israel. Jordanian foreign minister Abdul Ilah Khatib and Egyptian foreign minister Ahmed Aboul Gheit met with former Israeli Prime Minister Ehud Olmert, Foreign Minister Tzipi Livni, and Defense Minister Ehud Barak in Jerusalem on July 25, 2007, which was the first time that Israel received an official delegation from the Arab League.

The Arab League also sent President-Elect Obama an official communication that was signed by Saudi Foreign Minister Prince Saud al-Faisal and delivered to Obama via an aide. A spokesman for the Arab League explained that:

The letter explains our stance on the conflict, focusing on the Arab peace proposal. This is a new administration. It is important that we follow up with it and that it assumes its responsibilities. The new administration will be busy with other things, but we think that it is important for it to focus on the Arab–Israeli conflict.

In November 2008, The Sunday Times reported that U.S. president-elect Barack Obama is going to support the plan, saying to Mahmoud Abbas during his July 2008 visit to the Middle East that "The Israelis would be crazy not to accept this initiative. It would give them peace with the Muslim world from Indonesia to Morocco." After becoming president, Obama told Al Arabiya, "I might not agree with every aspect of the proposal, but it took great courage... to put forward something that is as significant as that."

George Mitchell, the United States special envoy to the Middle East, announced in March 2009 that the Obama administration intends to "incorporate" the initiative into its Middle East policy. It was also reported in March 2009 that the U.S. State Department is preparing a plan to market the Initiative to Israelis, and will release a document highlighting the gestures that Arab nations have agreed to take under the initiative. The report specified that the purpose was to "break down the Arab Peace Initiative into its details and not leave it as a purely theoretical framework."

On May 6, 2009, Al-Quds al-Arabi, the London-based Arabic language daily, reported that as per a request from U.S. president Barack Obama the Arab League is currently in the process of revising the initiative in an effort to encourage Israel to agree to it. The new revisions include a demilitarization of the future Palestinian state as well as a forfeiture of the Palestinian right of return to Israel proper. According to the revisions, a portion of the refugees would be relocated to the future Palestinian state, and the rest would be naturalized in other Arab countries.

On April 30, 2013, The Arab league re-endorsed the Arab Peace Initiative, with the updated terms that Israeli-Palestinian peace agreement should be based on the two-state solution on the basis of June 4, 1967 line, with the possibility of comparable and mutual agreed minor swaps of the land between Israel and Palestine.

Palestinians have criticised the Israel–United Arab Emirates normalization agreement and another with Bahrain signed in September 2020, fearing the moves weaken the Arab Peace Initiative, regarding the UAE's move as "a betrayal."

== See also ==
- 2012 return of bodies
- Foreign relations of Saudi Arabia
- Israeli views of the peace process
- Israeli Peace Initiative
- Palestinian views of the peace process
- The People's Voice
- Two-state solution
- Geneva Initiative
