= Alpher =

Alpher is a surname. Notable people with the surname include:

- Ralph Alpher (1921–2007), American cosmologist
- Yossi Alpher (born 1942), Israeli writer
