= Savoy Hotel attack =

1975 Palestinian attack against civilians in Tel Aviv, Israel

- Part of the Palestinian insurgency in South Lebanon
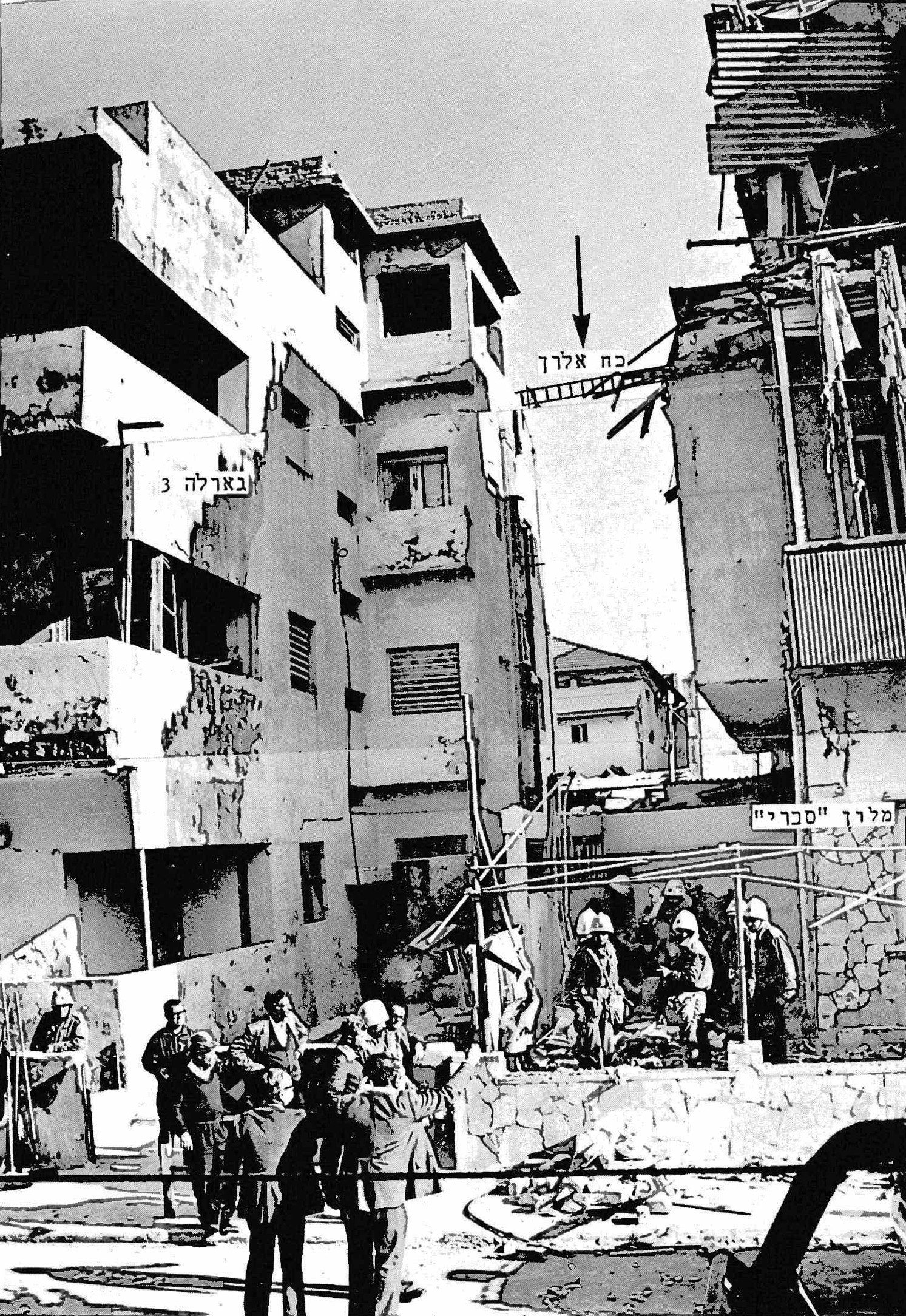
- The attack aftermath

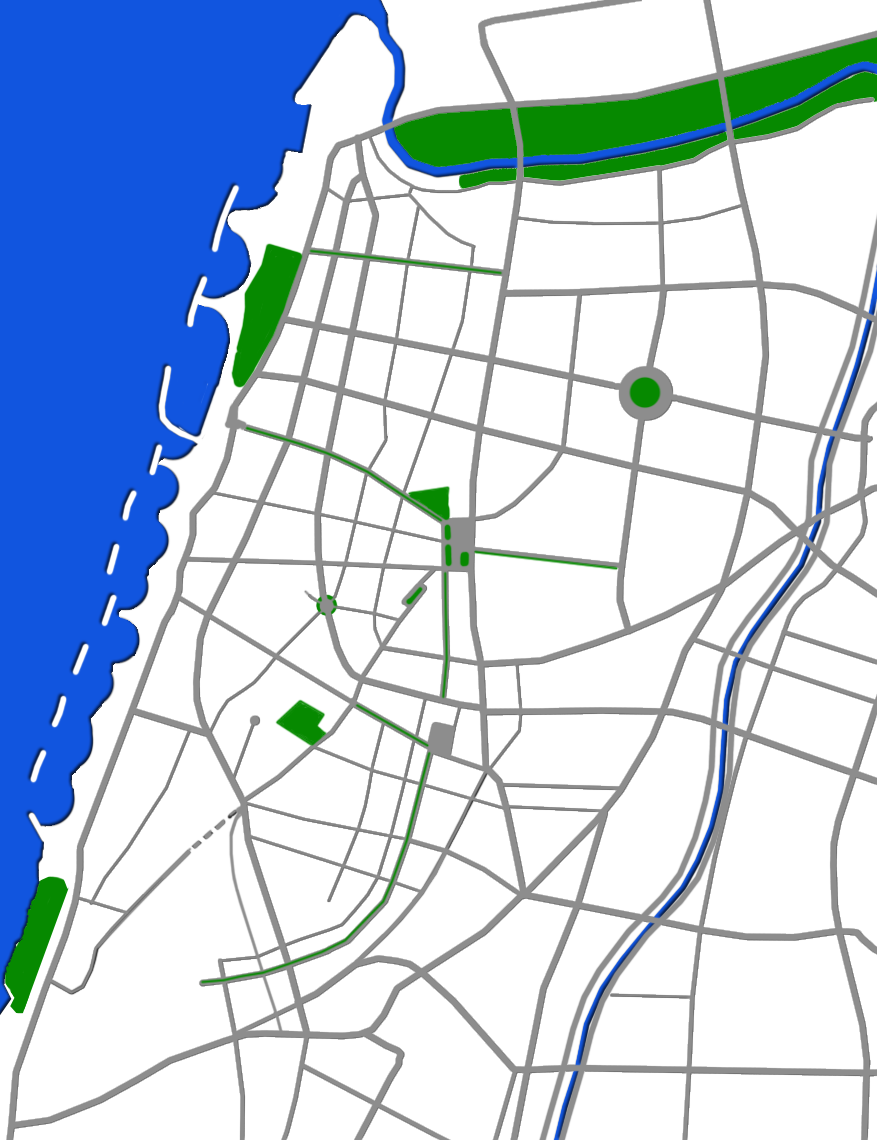
- Location: 32°04′21″N 34°45′57″E; Tel Aviv, Israel
- Date: 5–6 March 1975 (1 day)
- Attack type: Shooting spree, Hostage taking
- Deaths: 8 civilian hostages, 3 Israeli soldiers, 7 Fatah attackers
- Perpetrator: PLO claimed responsibility
- No. of participants: 8 Palestinian assailants

The Savoy Hotel attack was a terrorist attack by the Palestine Liberation Organization against the Savoy Hotel in Tel Aviv, Israel, on 5–6 March 1975.

== Background ==
The operation was planned by Abu Jihad.

Initial Palestinian planning had called for an attack against the Israeli tourist city of Nahariya, yet the team was apparently unable to locate the city on the night of a previous attempt, two months earlier. The operation's objectives were then changed to the Manshiya Neighborhood Youth Club and the Tel Aviv Opera Building. The contingency plan in case the original targets could not be located was to select any nearby buildings that were populated as targets.

The attackers were told to take hostages, then demand the release of Palestinian prisoners, as well as air transport out of Israel to Damascus. If the negotiations failed, they were told to kill their hostages and commit suicide. In the event of capture, they were instructed to tell their interrogators that they had come from Egypt, in the hope that this would result in a breakdown of ongoing Israeli-Egyptian peace negotiations, and to direct Israeli retaliation away from Lebanon.

== The attack ==
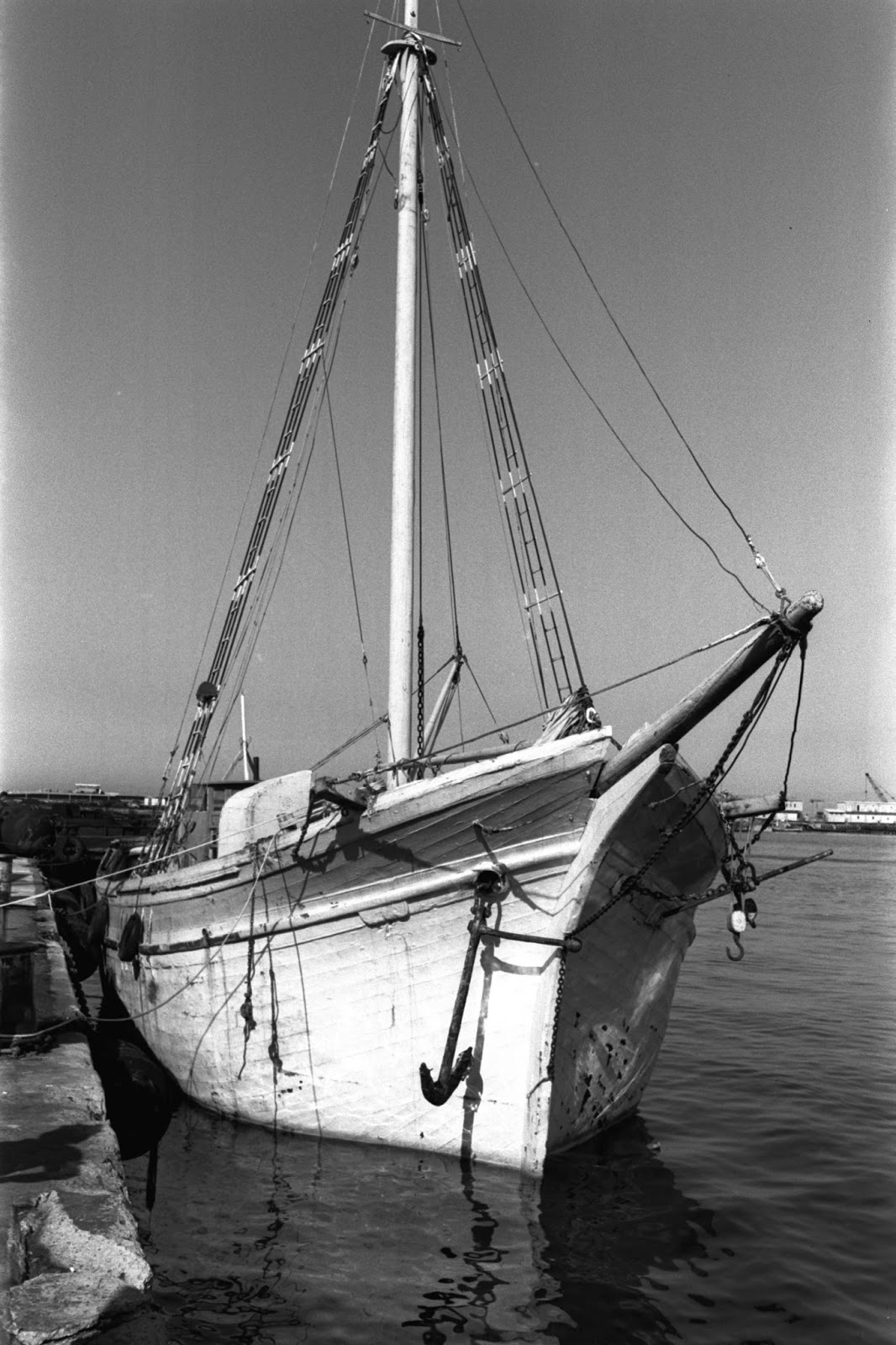
The vessel that transported the attackers

On the night of 6 March 1975, eight Palestinians in two boats landed on the Tel Aviv beach at the foot of Allenby Street. They had departed from the Lebanese port of Sarafenda, near Tyre on an Egyptian merchant vessel. When they were about 60 miles off Tel Aviv, the teams were lowered in a boat and proceeded towards the Tel Aviv shore. As they landed on the shore, they were spotted by police officers in a patrol vehicle that was passing by. The officers in the car opened fire at them, and one of the boats which was stocked with weapons was hit and exploded. The militants escaped the beach onto a street corner, leaving much of their weaponry behind in the boats. They then crossed onto Herbert Samuel Street, where they shot and threw grenades. Unable to locate their original targets, they tried but failed to break into a cinema. Afterwards, they continued down the street and took over the Savoy Hotel, at the corner of HaYarkon and Geula streets, near the center of the city. The Savoy Hotel was picked due to it being the only illuminated building on the street. During the takeover of the hotel, three people were killed. Three people managed to escape in the confusion, but most guests and staff were taken hostage and taken to the top floor of the building.

Private Moshe Deutschmann, a soldier from the Israeli army's Golani Brigade who was on home leave at the time, grabbed his weapon and ran to the hotel after hearing gunfire. Meanwhile, some militants attempted to leave the hotel. Deutschmann saw them at the entrance to the hotel and engaged them. In the exchange of fire, Deutschmann was hit. He managed to crawl away, and was later evacuated to Hadassah Medical Center, where he died of his injuries. Deutschmann was posthumously awarded the Medal of Distinguished Service.

Israeli security forces soon arrived on the scene, and the Palestinians barricaded themselves in the hotel with their hostages, detonated an explosive charge which caused part of the building to collapse, and threatened that if Israel did not release 20 Palestinian prisoners within four hours, the hostages would be executed. According to an eyewitness account:

When I went into the street, I saw a nightmarish spectacle. Red tracer bullets streaked through the night air. The four-story Savoy Hotel, illuminated by floodlights, was surrounded by troops, local police and border police in full battle regalia. Military vehicles, armored cars and personnel carriers clogged the surrounding streets. Red Magen David ambulance crews were administering first aid to wounded civilians on the sidewalks and gutters. Looking out to sea, the blinding light of magnesium flares revealed naval patrol boats cruising just off the beach.

Israeli security forces conducted negotiations with the militants. One hostage, Kochava Levy, became a mediator between the security forces and militants, as she spoke Arabic. During the negotiations, Levy provided the security forces detailed information on the militants.

Early the next morning, the Israeli counter-terrorism unit Sayeret Matkal stormed the hotel, killing seven of the perpetrators and capturing the eighth. Two Sayeret Matkal soldiers, Colonel Uzi Yairi and Sergeant Itamar Ben-David, were also killed. Five hostages were freed, while five were killed.

A few hours after the rescue operation, the boat that had transported the militants was captured on the high seas by the Israeli Navy. After the boat was detected by a reconnaissance aircraft, the Sa'ar 3-class missile boat INS Ga'ash and the Sa'ar 2-class missile boat INS Miznak moved to intercept it. They captured the boat about 70 miles off the coast of Hadera, and its crew was arrested. Two of the crew, who were Egyptian, were released, while the others were tried and convicted. One was sentenced to life imprisonment, while three others were given prison terms of 5–10 years.

== Assailants ==
Members of the Palestinian squad included Mousa Jum’a at-Tallaqa the sole survivor, Khadr Ahmad Jaram (squad commander), Omar Mahmoud ash-Shafi’i, Ahmad Hamid Abu Qamar, Abdallah Khalil Abdallah Kulaib, Muhammad Diya’ed-din al-Helwani, Mousa al-Abd Abu Tharya, and Nayif Najd Isma’il as-Saghir, who were all killed by the Israeli troops. Tallaqa was tried in a military court, convicted, and sentenced to death by hanging in March 1976. His death sentence was commuted. The bodies of those killed were released by the IDF in May 2012.

== Aftermath ==
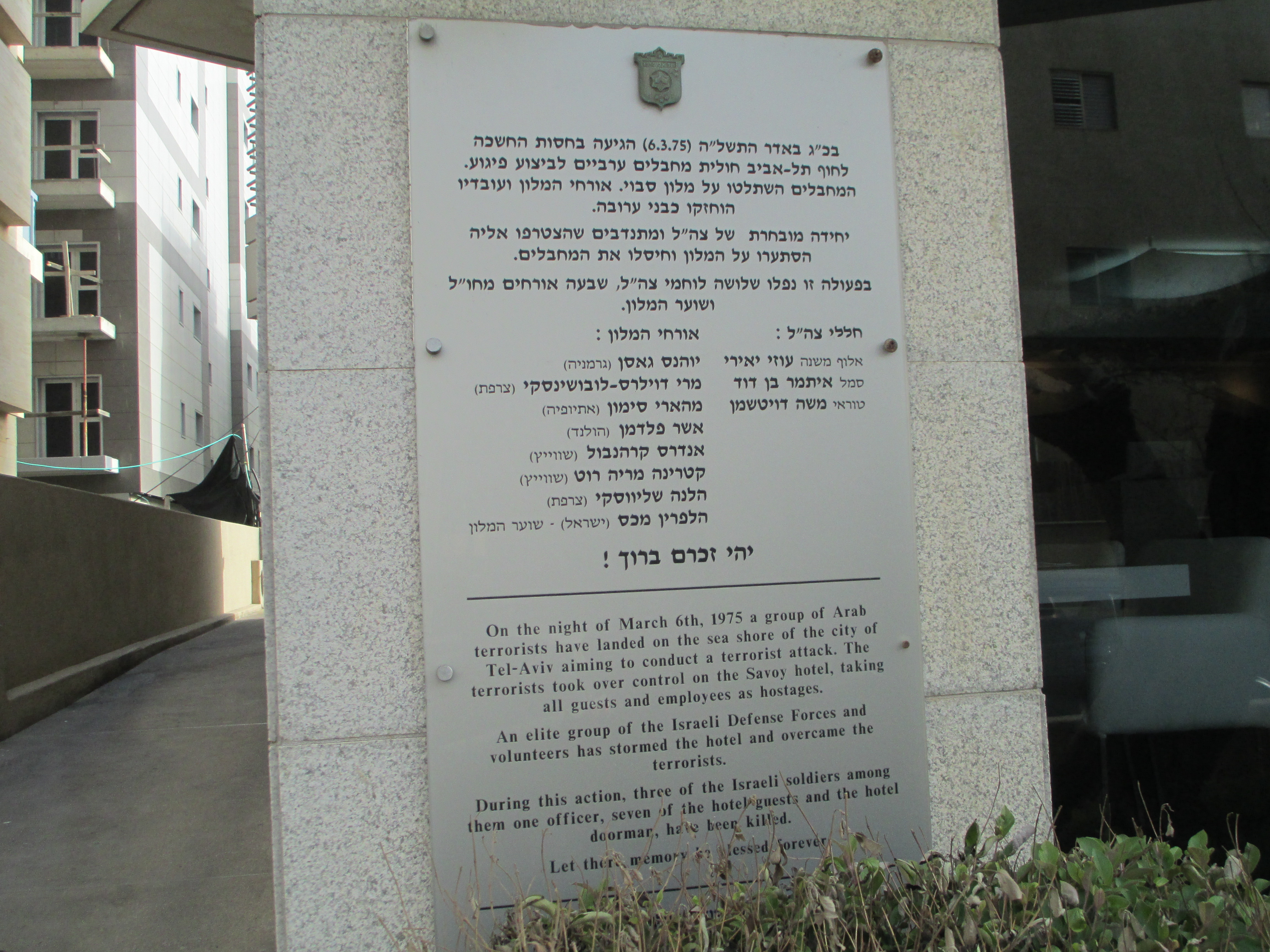
Memorial plaque with the names of the victims in front of the Savoy Hotel

The partially destroyed Savoy Hotel was completely demolished, and a new hotel of the same name was built in its place. The new Savoy Hotel opened in 1987. At its entrance is a memorial plaque with the names of the victims of the attack.

In August 2012, it was reported that the Ramallah municipality approved the construction of a mausoleum to honor the eight Palestinians who were involved in the attack (the vote was initially reported by the PA daily newspaper Al-Hayat Al-Jadida and subsequently translated into English by Palestinian Media Watch). The decision to build the mausoleum coincided with the return of the perpetrators' remains, which were among the bodies of 91 Palestinian militants repatriated to the Palestinian Authority in June 2012 as an Israeli good-will gesture.

Fatah caused a controversy in April 2021 after its Nablus branch reportedly made a Facebook post promoting the attack, incorrectly stating that "between 50 to 100" IDF soldiers were killed.

In 2022, the film Savoy (dir. Zohar Wagner) was released, dramatizing and exploring the event, particularly from the perspective of Kochava Levi.
