= Israeli Peace Initiative =

The Israeli Peace Initiative is a compromise plan given by the political left within Israel in response to the Arab Peace Initiative issued by the Arab League in 2002 and again in 2007. It was released on April 6, 2011. It compromises with the Palestinians in an effort to establish peace in Israel. One of the key differences from other peace plans is that the Israeli Peace Initiative proposes a complete withdrawal of Israeli forces from the Gaza Strip and the West Bank. It also calls for the establishment of the Temple Mount as neutral ground between Palestine and Israel, and the retention of the Jewish Quarter of the Old City within Israel. Additionally, the peace plan addresses Israel's relations with its Arab neighbors, including settling the dispute over the Golan Heights, territory that Israel captured from Syria in the Six-Day War.

== Endorsement ==
It was signed by 40 people. Among the signatories are former Shin Bet chiefs Yaakov Peri and Ami Ayalon, former Mossad Chief Danny Yatom and former IDF Chief Amnon Lipkin-Shahak, General (Res) Amram Mitzna, former minister Moshe Shahal and Yuval Rabin, son of slain Prime Minister Yitzhak Rabin. All 40 are considered to be affiliated with the political Left.

== Notable differences from other plans ==
- The text refers to both Palestinian and Jewish refugees, though only discusses solutions for the former. The issue of Jewish refugees from Arab and Muslim countries has been a big issue in Israel for decades, however, it has never been formally address in any negotiations.
- It talks of "an Israeli withdrawal" but does not say "complete" or "full," in the same manner in which UNSC Resolution 242 refers to a withdrawal "from territories" but not "from the or all territories." This is important because it recognizes the fact that there will need to be some adjustments to the border. In this regard, IPI is slightly more specific, stating that land swaps must be on a 1:1 ratio and cannot exceed 7% of the West Bank.
- Recognition of Israel as a Jewish State and Palestine as a Palestinian State is required. In recent years, the Israeli government has been pushing the Palestinian Authority to recognize Israel as a Jewish State, IPI makes this a requirement but forces Israel to do the same.
- An Arab minority is guaranteed "full equal civil rights" in Israel.
- Jerusalem is to be divided along Jewish-Arab lines, with Israel keeping the Jewish Quarter of the Old City but not the Temple Mount. The Temple Mount is to be under no specific sovereignty or under God's sovereignty. This idea was brought up during Oslo and Camp David. However, it doesn't address the fact that right now it is under Israeli sovereignty but Jordanian religious authority.
- The Islamic Holy Places are to be under a "Muslim Waqf," but it doesn't say which one. It is currently under a Jordanian Waqf.
- The Right of Return can only be realized in a Palestinian State and the territories to be transferred to it by Israel. Only a symbolic number of refugees will be allowed into Israel.
- "All elements in the region" are to be consulted in order to solve the refugee problem. The authors use the word "הגורמים" which can mean both "elements" (a possible reference to Hamas) or "responsible bodies/authorities" (a possible reference to the Palestinian Authority since it isn't a state yet).
- It discusses both Syria and Lebanon.

== The Israeli Peace Initiative, 6 April 2011 ==
=== The State of Israel ===
- Declares that it is its strategic objective to obtain historic compromise leading to formal regional arrangements that would bring about an end to all claims and conflicts, achieve peace, security, economic growth in the Middle East, and fully normalized relations between Israel and all Arab and Islamic countries.
- Recognizes the suffering of the Palestinian refugees from 1948 and the suffering of the Jewish refugees from Arab countries, and recognizes the need to solve the problem of the Palestinian refugees by mutual agreement and realistic solutions.
- Believes that cooperation between all sides is vital to ensure that the Middle East enjoys economic prosperity, high environmental quality and a future of prosperity and welfare for all peoples.
- Appreciates the Arab Peace Initiative of March 2002 as a historic step by the Arab countries to achieve a breakthrough and make progress on a regional level, and offers this as a partner declaration since "a military solution to the conflict will not achieve peace nor guarantee security for all parties."

Therefore, Israel accepts the Arab Peace Initiative as a framework for regional peace negotiations, and offers the Israeli Peace Initiative as a response, outlining Israel's vision of final status arrangements, which will be achieved through negotiations with the representatives of Arab countries, the Palestinians and Israel based on the following principles:

=== Ending all conflicts ===
The founding principle of a permanent settlement in the region is an Israeli withdrawal, security arrangements, normal relations and an end to all conflicts, taking the security considerations of all parties into account, including the challenges of water resources, demographic realities on the ground, and the special needs of the three great religions. In addition, the Israeli–Palestinian conflict will be solved on the basis of Two States for Two Peoples: a State of Palestine as the nation-state of the Palestinian people and the State of Israel as the nation-state of the Jews (within which there is an Arab minority who will have full equal civil rights as outlined in Israel's Declaration of Independence). Based on these principles, Israel offers the following vision:

=== Permanent-status parameters to settle the Israeli–Palestinian issue ===
1. Palestinian State – A sovereign, viable, and independent Palestinian State will be established in the West Bank and Gaza Strip from which Israel will withdraw. The Palestinian State will be demilitarized with full rights and responsibilities for internal security forces. The international community will play an active role in ensuring the security of the borders and in fighting terrorist threats.
2. Borders – The borders of Palestine will be based on the lines of 4 June 1967 with agreed upon alterations based on the following principles: creating territorial contiguity between the parts of the Palestinian state; land swaps on the ratio of 1:1 (which will not exceed more than 7% of the West Bank) with an area (to be determined according to the precise needs) to create a safe passageway between the West Bank and Gaza Strip which will be under de facto Palestinian control.
3. Jerusalem – The Jerusalem area will include the two capitals of the two states. The line will be drawn in the following way: The Jewish neighborhoods will be under Israeli sovereignty; the Arab neighborhoods will be under Palestinian sovereignty; special arrangements will be introduced for the Old City, which will ensure inter alia that the Western Wall and Jewish Quarter will be under Israeli sovereignty; The Temple Mount will remain without any sovereignty (or "Under God's Sovereignty"), additional special arrangements will be introduced in regards to Islamic Holy Places to be run by the Muslim Waqf, and the Jewish Holy Places or Interests will be run by Israel, and an Israeli–International monitoring committee will be established in order to realize these arrangements.
4. Refugees – Resolving the refugee issue will be achieved by mutual agreement between all elements in the region based on the following principles: a financial compensation package will be offered by the international community and Israel for refugees in the countries where they are residing; refugees who choose to return to their homes (as specified in UN Resolution 194) could return only to the territories of the Palestinian State, except for a symbolic amount to be agreed upon.

=== Permanent-status parameters to settle the Israeli–Syrian issue ===
1. Borders – Israel will withdraw from the Golan Heights and return to a border based on that from 4 June 1967 with adjustments, to be agreed upon, on a limited scale and the territorial exchange ratio of 1:1, which will reflect the international border of 1923. The mutual agreement will be implemented in a number of phases, similar to the model applied in the Sinai Peninsula, and for a time period not to exceed five years.
2. Security Arrangements – The sides will agree on a package of security arrangements, which will define (by mutual consent) the amount of land to be demilitarized on each side of the border and arrangements for the deployment of international peacekeeping forces.

=== Permanent-status parameters to settle the Israeli–Lebanese issue ===
1. Borders – Israel and Lebanon will establish a permanent settlement based on Resolution 1701, under whose framework, Israel has already completed its withdrawal to the international border.
2. Lebanese Sovereignty – In addition to the full implementation of Resolution 1701, Lebanon will fully assert its sovereignty in its territory through the Lebanese Army.

=== State of peace ===
Each of the final status agreements that will be signed between Israel and the Palestinians, Israel and Syria, and Israel and Lebanon, the parties will implement the instructions of the United Nations Charter and the principles of International Law that govern relations between states in peacetime; they will resolve all disputes by peaceful means; they will develop good, neighborly relations of coordinating bodies in order to ensure sustainable security; they will refrain from threats or the use of force against one another, refrain from joining a coalition, organization or alliance of any kind that has military or security nature, involving a third party, whose goals or activities include aggression or other acts of military hostility against the other side.

=== Creating regional security ===
1. The parties will establish regional security mechanisms for dealing with common dangers and threats from states, terrorist organizations, pirate gangs and guerrilla organizations, in order to ensure the peace and security of all nations in the region.
2. The parties will establish regional frameworks of cooperation for fighting crime and dealing with environmental dangers.

=== Open economic cooperation across the region ===
Through extensive financial assistance from the international community, the parties will implement broad cooperative projects to ensure the stability, vitality, and prosperity of the region, and achieve the maximum utilization of energy and water resources for the benefit of all parties. These projects will contribute to improving transportation infrastructure, agriculture, industry, and regional tourism, which will help deal with rising unemployment in the region. In the future, the parties will work to establish a "Middle Eastern Economic Bloc" (which will invite all countries in the region to join), with the aim of achieving a special status for the Bloc with the European Union, the US and the entire international community.

=== Normal diplomatic relations and ties across the region ===
Israel, Arab lands and Islamic countries need to promote gradual steps towards the establishment of normal relations between them, in the spirit of the Arab Peace Initiative – steps which will start with the launch of peace negotiations, with will gradually deepen, expand, and upgrade to the level of full normal relations (including diplomatic relations, open borders and economic ties) with the signing of permanent-status agreements in parallel to their implementation.
