= Samir Abu Eisheh =

Palestinian politician (born 1960)

- سمير أبو عيشة

Minister of Planning
- In office 29 March 2006 – 14 June 2007
- President: Mahmoud Abbas
- Prime Minister: Ismail Haniyeh
- Preceded by: Ghassan Khatib
- Succeeded by: Samir Abdullah

Acting Minister of Finance
- In office January 2007 – 17 March 2007
- President: Mahmoud Abbas
- Prime Minister: Ismail Haniyeh
- Preceded by: Yousef Rizqa (acting)
- Succeeded by: Salam Fayyad

Personal details
- Born: 25 August 1960 (age 65) Beit Wazan, Jordanian-administered West Bank, Palestine
- Party: Hamas
- Education: University of Jordan (bachelor's); Pennsylvania State University (master's, PhD)
- Occupation: Politician, civil engineer, professor

Samir Abu Eisheh (Arabic: سمير أبو عيشة; born 25 August 1960) is a Palestinian politician, civil engineer and professor. He served as the Minister of Planning in the Tenth Government and Eleventh (National Unity) Government of Palestine (2006–2007). He graduated from the Pennsylvania State University with a PhD in civil engineering. Abu Eisheh also served as a consultant to several Palestinian institutions including the Ministry of Planning as well as several other institutions locally and internationally before being the Minister of Planning. He also spent some time as a visiting professor in a number of US and European universities. He is the publisher of more than 60 research studies and articles on civil engineering and planning.

Political offices
Preceded by Ghassan Khatib	Minister of Planning; 2006–2007	Succeeded by Samir Abdullah
Preceded by Yousef Rizqa; Acting	Minister of Finance; Acting; 2007	Succeeded by Salam Fayyad
