= 2016 Arab League summit =

Meeting of Arab regional organization

Arab League 27th summit Summit of Hope
- Host country: Mauritania
- Date: 25–27 June 2016
- Cities: Nouakchott
- Follows: 2015
- Precedes: 2017
- Website: nouakchottsummit.mr?lang=ar

The 2016 Arab League Summit was held in Nouakchott, Mauritania from 25 to 27 June 2016.

The summit focused mostly on Yemen, as well as discussing the Arab Military Joint Coalition and having a bigger role in the region.

== Delays ==
The Arab League summits are traditionally held in late March, yet this summit wasn't. It was originally supposed to be held in Morocco according to the cycle that the Arab League Summits follows, in February, Morocco officially refused to host the summit that was scheduled for the following Month, Mauritania was adamant to hold the 2016's Arab League summit that it has said it is willing to host it in a “tent” if need be. And it has stuck to its promise.

The summit that held the motto of "hope", was a message to Syria, Libya, Yemen and most importantly Palestine.

Mauritania is one of the farthest located Arab countries from the rest of its Middle Eastern neighbors. Its official language is Arabic.

== Top Summit Agenda ==
Syria, Iraq, Yemen, Libya were all marked as top Arab League summit agenda, Arab leaders, speaking at the opening of the Arab League summit in the Mauritanian capital, have pledged to "defeat terrorism", with the ongoing threat of violence in the region dominating the agenda. Egypt's Prime minister, was one of the first of the 21 leaders to speak and blamed foreign intervention in the region for the rise of groups such as the Islamic State of Iraq and the Levant (ISIL, also known as ISIS) and for the radicalization of young people.

=== Syria ===
Several Arab League member states have confirmed that there is no solution for the Syria situation without the removal of Assad.

Adel al-Jubeir, the Saudi foreign minister, addressed the conflict in Syria, saying there could be no solution while President Bashar al-Assad was still in power.

=== Palestine ===
Arab leaders also voiced support for a new French initiative aimed at relaunching Israeli-Palestinian talks and holding an international conference for peace by year end.
