= Nabeel Kassis =

Palestainian nuclear physicist and politician (born 1945)

- نبيل قسيس

Minister of Finance
- In office 16 May 2012 – 3 March 2013
- President: Mahmoud Abbas
- Prime Minister: Salam Fayyad
- Preceded by: Salam Fayyad
- Succeeded by: Salam Fayyad

Minister of Planning
- In office 12 November 2003 – 24 February 2005
- President: Yasser Arafat; Rawhi Fattouh (acting); Mahmoud Abbas
- Prime Minister: Ahmed Qurei
- Preceded by: Salam Fayyad
- Succeeded by: Ghassan Khatib
- In office 30 April 2003 – 7 October 2003
- President: Yasser Arafat
- Prime Minister: Mahmoud Abbas
- Preceded by: Nabil Shaath
- Succeeded by: Salam Fayyad

Minister of Tourism and Antiquities
- In office 13 June 2002 – 30 April 2003
- President: Yasser Arafat
- Preceded by: Mitri Abu Aita
- Succeeded by: Mitri Abu Aita

Minister of State for Bethlehem Affairs
- In office 9 August 1998 – 13 June 2002
- President: Yasser Arafat
- Preceded by: Position established
- Succeeded by: Position abolished

Personal details
- Born: 16 February 1945 (age 81) Jerusalem, Palestine
- Party: Independent
- Education: University of Mainz (master's); American University of Beirut (PhD)
- Occupation: Academic, politician

Nabeel Kassis (Arabic: نبيل قسيس; born 16 February 1945), also transliterated as Nabil Kassis, Nabil Qasis, Nabeel Qassis, etc., is a Palestinian academic, politician, diplomat, physicist, and nuclear scientist.

== Early life ==
Nabeel Kassis was born on 16 February 1945 in Jerusalem, Palestine during the British mandate period.

== Academic career ==
Kassis studied in Germany and Lebanon, earning a master's degree from the University of Mainz, and a PhD from the American University of Beirut, both in nuclear physics. He taught physics at a number of universities in Germany, Italy, France, England, Lebanon, and Jordan before joining Birzeit University in 1980. He served as President of Birzeit University from 2004 to 2010.

== Diplomatic career ==
Kassis was a member of the Palestinian delegation to the Madrid Peace Conference in 1991, and a deputy head of the negotiation delegation at the Washington talks in 1992 to 1993. He later became the Director-General of the Technical and Advisory Committee to the Palestinian negotiation team, established to do preparatory work for the transition to Palestinian self-government. He was a member of the Palestinian delegation on final status negotiations in 1999.

== Political career ==
As a proponent of transparency and reform, Kassis was appointed member of the Special Committee for the Investigation of the Auditor's Report in 1997. He later entered government as a political independent, serving as minister of state in 1998, Tourism Minister in 2002, Planning Minister from 2003 to 2005, and Finance Minister from 2012 to 2013.

Political offices
New office	Minister of State for Bethlehem Affairs; 1998–2002	Position abolished
Preceded by Mitri Abu Aita	Minister of Tourism and Antiquities; 2002–2003	Succeeded by Mitri Abu Aita
Preceded by Nabil Shaath	Minister of Planning; 2003	Succeeded by Salam Fayyad
Preceded by Salam Fayyad	Minister of Planning; 2003–2005	Succeeded by Ghassan Khatib
Preceded by Salam Fayyad	Minister of Finance; 2012–2013	Succeeded by Salam Fayyad
