= 2018 Arab League summit =

Meeting of Arab regional organization

The Arab League's 29th summit Dhahran Summit
- Host country: Saudi Arabia
- Date: 15 April 2018
- Cities: Dhahran, Eastern Province
- Venues: King Abdulaziz Center for World Culture
- Follows: 2017
- Precedes: 2019

The 2018 Arab League Summit (also known as the Dhahran Summit or Dammam Summit or Jerusalem summit) was the Arab League's 29th summit held in Dhahran, Saudi Arabia on Sunday, 15 April 2018. The Summit was initially expected to be held in Riyadh. A preparatory meeting was held in Riyadh on Thursday, 12 April 2018 which was presided over by the Saudi Minister of Foreign Affairs Adel al-Jubeir. Foreign Ministers of the 22 countries attended the meeting.

== Attendance ==
=== Arab League representatives ===
- Djibouti - Ismail Omar Guelleh
- Egypt - President Abdel Fattah el-Sisi
- Iraq - President Fuad Masum
- Lebanon - President Michel Aoun
- Mauritania - Mohamed Ould Abdel Aziz
- Morocco - King Mohammed VI
- Palestine - Mahmoud Abbas
- Saudi Arabia - King Salman
- Somalia - Mohamed Abdullahi Mohamed
- Sudan - President Omar al-Bashir
- Tunisia - Beji Caid Essebsi
- Yemen - Abdrabbuh Mansur Hadi

=== Other participants ===
- African Union Commission - Chairman of the African Union Commission Moussa Faki
- European Union - High Representative of the European Union for Foreign Affairs and Security Policy Federica Mogherini
- United Nations - Secretary-General António Guterres

== Venue ==
The summit was announced to be held at the King Abdulaziz Center for World Culture which was constructed by Saudi Aramco and was opened in 2016.

== Security Measures ==
As a security measure a number of roads were closed for traffic in the Dammam-Dhahran-Khobar region. It was also declared that all educational institutions would remain closed on Sunday.

== Invitation to Qatar ==
Despite the blockade imposed on Qatar by Saudi Arabia and a number of other countries, an official invitation was sent to Qatar to attend the Summit. The Foreign Ministry of Qatar issued a statement that Qatar had accepted the invitation and would be attending the Summit. The Saudi Foreign Minister al-Jubeir announced that the Qatar diplomatic crisis would not be discussed at the Summit.
