= Ghassan Khatib =

Palestinian politician (born 1954)

- غسان الخطيب
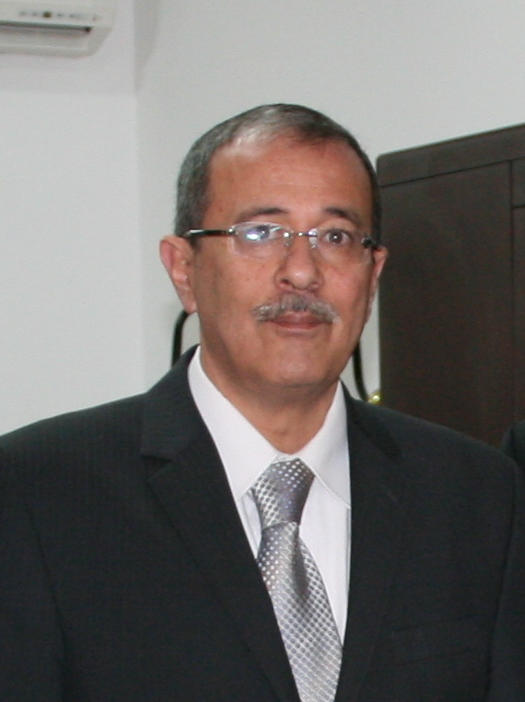

Director of the Government Media Centre, Palestinian Authority
- In office 2009–2012

Minister of Planning, Palestinian Authority
- In office 2005–2006
- Preceded by: Nabeel Kassis
- Succeeded by: Samir Abu Eisheh

Minister of Labor, Palestinian Authority
- In office 2002–2004
- Succeeded by: Hassan abu Libdeh

Personal details
- Born: 1954 (age 71–72) Nablus, West Bank
- Party: Palestinian People's Party
- Children: 3
- Education: Durham University
- Occupation: Politician, academic, writer

Ghassan Khatib (Arabic: غسان الخطيب; born 1954) is a Palestinian politician. He was born in Nablus, in the West Bank, and is a member of the Palestinian People's Party. Khatib is married and has three children. He was also a member of the Madrid Peace Delegation in 1991 and was involved in the Washington negotiations from 1991 to 1993. He was appointed the Palestinian National Authority Minister of Labor in 2002, then the Planning Minister in 2005–06.

== Biography ==
Khatib holds a PhD in Middle East politics from Durham University (2007), an MA in Development Studies from the University of Manchester (1986). and a BA Business Administration and Economics from Birzeit University (1982). He is lecturer of Contemporary Arab Studies and International Studies at Birzeit University.

He has served as Director of Government Media Center in 2009–2012 and Palestinian Minister of Labor 2002–2004 and Minister of Planning 2005–2006. Khatib was vice-president for community outreach in 2006–2009, and vice president for Advancement in 2012–2016 at Birzeit University. He was Founder and director of the Jerusalem Media & Communication Centre, which specializes in research, opinion polling and media activities. He was a member of the Palestinian delegation for the Madrid Middle East Peace Conference in 1991 and the subsequent bilateral Palestinian-Israeli negotiations in Washington from 1991 to 1993.

Khatib co-founded and co-directed bitterlemons.org, a Palestinian-Israeli internet-based political magazine. He was a member of the Joint Working Group on Israel-Palestine Relations at Weatherhead Center for International Affairs at Harvard University.

Khatib was tricked into appearing in the 2009 mockumentary Brüno, where Sacha Baron Cohen tried to solve the Middle East crisis in a sit-down with Khatib and Yossi Alpher.

== Work ==
- Palestinian Politics and the Middle East Peace Process: consensus and competition in the Palestinian negotiation team. London: Routledge, 2010. ISBN 978-0-415-49334-5
