= Israeli transfer of Palestinian militant bodies (2012) =

In June 2012, Israel, handed over the remains of 91 Palestinians who died in combat against Israel, including some who carried out suicide attacks. This was part of a goodwill gesture to PA chairman Mahmoud Abbas to help revive the peace talks and reinstate direct negotiations between Israel and the Palestinians, although President Mahmoud Abbas did not indicate whether he was willing to return to talks. American Secretary of State Hillary Clinton said that there was an opportunity for negotiations and hoped that this move had enhanced it.

== The militants ==
All those who were returned in the transfer were killed carrying out attacks on Israelis. The dead were responsible for the deaths of hundreds of Israelis, many civilians, and most of them died while carrying out attacks against Israelis. The militants are considered martyrs by many Palestinians, but viewed as terrorists by many Israelis. The bodies included some suicide bombers and militants who had perpetrated the:

- Shmuel HaNavi bus bombing in 2003 which killed twenty-three people, many of them children, and wounded over 130,
- Cafe Hillel bombing in 2003 killing 7 and injuring over 50,
- Bombing of two buses in Beersheba in 2004 killing 16 people, including a three-year-old child, and wounded over 80,
- Stage night club bombing in 2005 killing 5 and injuring over 50,
- Open-air Hadera Market bombing in 2005 killing 7 and wounding 55,
- Savoy Hotel Attack in Tel Aviv killing eleven hostages,
- Afula shopping mall bombing in 2003 killing three people and injuring 70

== Palestinian response ==
President Abbas and the Palestinian leadership accorded them a modest military ceremony, which was attended by the families of the dead. The Palestinian governments held ceremonies in the West Bank and Gaza. Abbas attended an official ceremony at his Mukataa compound and Prisoners Affairs Minister Qaraqi called on Palestinians for a day of celebration. The rally was attended by Abbas, Hamas members, PLO leaders, clerics and families of the dead militants. The coffins were draped in Palestinian national flags and placed in the Mukataa's central square and Jerusalem mufti, Muhammad Hussein, held a requiem for the dead. Armed Islamic Jihad fighters and families of the dead welcomed the coffins and Hamas police officers fired shots in salute. The seven militants that perpetrated the Savoy Hotel Attack in Tel Aviv in 1975 were given a special honor. Afterwards, Palestinian Authority cars were used to transport the bodies for burial and a prayer service was held at a Gazan mosque before their interment. The Palestinian Authority described the militants as having been "killed in action". The Palestinian Authority TV program for youth, Speak up, reported that the militants were "More honored than all of us" and that "they are the greatest role models for us."

== Impact on peace process ==
The Israeli government transferred the bodies as an incentive to restart the peace process between Israelis and Palestinians. Mark Regev, the Israeli government spokesman, said, "We hope that this humanitarian gesture will serve both as a confidence-building measure and help get the peace process back on track... Israel is ready for the immediate resumption of peace talks without any preconditions whatsoever."

However, the transfer did not restart the peace process, and Palestinian leader Mahmoud Abbas said he would only negotiate if Israel re-froze settlement construction and negotiated based on the "1967 lines." The Jerusalem Post reported that Israeli authorities are upset over the Palestinian Authority's failure to respond positively to a number of goodwill gestures, which indicates that Mahmoud Abbas is "unable to enter into negotiations that will require concessions" and "despite a series of steps taken by Israel, the Palestinian Authority nevertheless continues in a very negative pattern of behavior." Other goodwill gestures included agreeing to start negotiations with the Palestinians on developing the Gaza Marine gas field off the Gaza Strip coast, the signing of an economic accord with the Palestinian Authority to enhance trade and crack down on tax evasion, the decision to transfer NIS 180 million of tax money to the Palestinian Authority so salaries could be paid; and the decision to increase the number of Palestinian construction workers allowed to work in the country by some 5,000.

== Criticism ==
Arsen Ostrovsky wrote that the Palestinian glorification of terror remained the principal obstacle to peace with Israel and criticized the Palestinian Authority's response. The Almagor terror victims association criticised Prime Minister Binyamin Netanyahu and the Israeli High Court of Justice for the decision to return the bodies. They petitioned the High Court expressing a concern that the PA would use the releases as an opportunity to glorify the terrorists and terrorism. Elyakim Haetzni questioned Israel's tolerance of the "ethos of Jew-hatred and murder" and the viability of peace with someone "whose heroes are the murderers". The Jerusalem Post criticised the PA celebrations and the glorification of those "whose crimes constitute the absolute antithesis to peace."

== See also ==
- Israeli–Palestinian peace process
- Oslo Accords
- Camp David 2000 Summit
- The Clinton Parameters
- Taba summit
- Arab Peace Initiative
- Road Map for Peace
