= Palestinian views on the peace process =

Palestinians hold a diverse range of views on the peace process with Israel, though the goal that unites them is the end of the Israeli occupation of the West Bank. Some Palestinians accept a two-state solution, with the West Bank and the Gaza Strip forming a distinct Palestinian state, whereas other Palestinians insist on a one-state solution (Palestinian or binational) with equal rights for all citizens whether they are Muslims, Christians or Jews. In this scenario, Palestinian refugees may be allowed to resettle the land they were forced to flee in the 1948 Palestinian expulsion and flight.

== Background ==
Palestinians have held diverse views and perceptions of the peace process. A key starting point for understanding these views is an awareness of the differing objectives sought by advocates of the Palestinian cause. 'New Historian' Israeli academic Ilan Pappe says the cause of the conflict from a Palestinian point of view dates back to 1948 with the creation of Israel (rather than Israel’s views of 1967 being the crucial point and the return of occupied territories being central to peace negotiations), and that the conflict has been a fight to bring home refugees to a Palestinian state. Therefore, this for some was the ultimate aim of the peace process, and for groups such as Hamas still is. However, Jerome Slater says that this ‘maximalist’ view of a destruction of Israel in order to regain Palestinian lands, a view held by Arafat and the PLO initially, has steadily moderated from the late 1960s onwards to a preparedness to negotiate and instead seek a two-state solution. The Oslo Accords demonstrated the recognition of this acceptance by the then Palestinian leadership of the State of Israel’s right to exist in return for the withdrawal of Israeli forces from the Gaza Strip and West Bank. However, there are recurrent themes prevalent throughout peace process negotiations including a feeling that Israel offers too little and a mistrust of its actions and motives. Yet, the demand for the Right of Return by descendants of Palestinian refugees to Israel has remained a cornerstone of the Palestinian view and has been repeatedly enunciated by Palestinian president Mahmoud Abbas.

== Yasser Arafat and the PLO ==
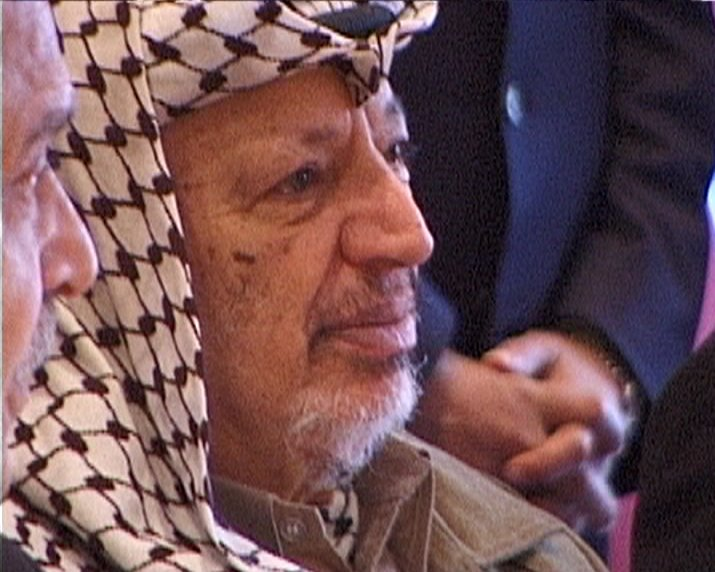
Yasser Arafat

Our basic aim is to liberate the land from the Mediterranean Seas to the Jordan River.... The Palestinian revolution's basic concern is the uprooting of the Zionist entity from our land and liberating it.

— Yasser Arafat, 1970

The PLO has complex, often contradictory attitudes to peace with Israel. Officially, the PLO accepted Israel's right to exist in peace, which was the first of the PLO's obligations under the Oslo Accords. In Yasser Arafat's 9 September 1993 letter to Israeli Prime Minister Yitzhak Rabin, as part of the first Oslo Accord, Arafat stated that "The PLO recognizes the right of the State of Israel to exist in peace and security." These remarks from Arafat were seen as a shift from one of the PLO's previous primary aims—the destruction of Israel.

However, during the 1990s and 2000s the PLO leadership has stated that it considered any peace with Israel was to be temporary until the dream of Israel's destruction could be realized. According to British-Israeli historian Efraim Karsh, Arafat often spoke of the peace process in terms of "justice" for the Palestinians; terms Karsh described as "euphemisms rooted in Islamic and Arabic history for the liberation of the whole of Palestine from 'foreign occupiers.'" When describing his views of the peace process among Arab leaders and in the media of the Arab world, Arafat's rhetoric became noticeably more bellicose than it was when among Western leaders and media outside of the Arab world according to Karsh. The period saw a disconnect between what the PLO's second in command Abu Iyad referred to as "the language of peace" and support of fighting Israel.

Since the 1990s, there has been a debate within the PLO as to whether to halt fighting with Israel completely or to continue attacking Israel as well as negotiate diplomatically with Israel. In practice, violence was never fully banned. Furthermore, assassination attempts by radical Palestinian factions within the PLO since the early years of the peace process kept Arafat from expressing full, public support of the peace process or condemnation of violence without risking further danger to his own life.

In 2000, Arafat participated in the Camp David Summit with Ehud Barak. Arafat rejected Israel's offer because it did not include Palestinian control of East Jerusalem or the right of return of Palestinian refugees. In response, Barak stated that Israel had "no partner" in peace, and Israelis increasingly viewed Palestinians as unwilling to make peace. Israeli-British historian Efraim Karsh referred to Arafat's insistence on the right of return as aiming for "Israel’s destruction through demographic subversion”. Similarly, Alan Dershowitz stated that Arafat put his desire to destroy Israel above his dream of building a Palestinian state.

In 2009, chief Palestinian negotiator Saeb Erekat pointed to stopping Israeli settlements on Palestinian land and a plan for a Palestinian state on the 1967 borders as the highest Palestinian priorities in peace talks. Peace talks between Israel and Arafat's successor, Mahmoud Abbas, have made little progress due to the continued increase of Israeli settlements in the West Bank.

== Hamas and Palestinian Islamic Jihad ==
A flag, with the Shahadah, frequently used by Hamas supporters

In 1981, an offshoot of the Palestinian Muslim Brotherhood called Islamic Jihad was founded. Unlike the Muslim Brotherhood, they declined to negotiate with Israel and focused on armed conflict with Israel rather than Islamic education. The Muslim Brotherhood became increasingly supportive of armed resistance and eventually decided to form Hamas.

Established in 1988 during the First Intifada, Hamas's founding charter refers to modern-day Israel and Palestine as "an Islamic land entrusted to the Muslim generations". It rejects the validity of the State of Israel and emphasizes the importance of armed resistance for Palestinian liberation. The document is often characterized as calling for the destruction of Israel.

While the PLO pursued the Oslo Accords and other plans for peace with Israel, Hamas opposed them and engaged in suicide attacks on Israelis in the 1990s. The attacks, intended to prevent the peace talks from progressing, contributed to both Israeli disillusionment with the peace process and the election of Benjamin Netanyahu, who also opposed the Oslo Accords. Polling showed that most Palestinians opposed the suicide attacks.

Hamas considered the PLO's strategy of peace talks with Israel to be a "path of surrender" that would lead to a “life of humiliation [under] a despicable occupation" due to the PLO's agreement to adopt responsibility for security in the West Bank under the Palestinian Authority. After the collapse of the 2000 Camp David Summit, Hamas urged the PLO to join their "jihadist project for our struggle".

When the Second Intifada broke out, Hamas and Islamic Jihad participated. Hamas viewed violence as a tool for deterring Israeli attacks and gaining concessions from Israel, and many Palestinians saw it as justified due to Israeli actions, including building settlements in the West Bank. Hamas undertook a ceasefire with Israel in August 2004. The Palestinian Islamic Jihad was unhappy with the ceasefire. In September 2005, Hamas was criticized by Islamic Jihad for calling off rocket attacks on Israel from Gaza.

According to a March 2006 poll, 70% of Hamas supporters said they would want peace with Israel if a Palestinian state was established. Beginning in 2006, Hamas has called for a Palestinian state along the 1967 borders. In 2008, Hamas publicly offered a long-term hudna (truce) with Israel if Israel agreed to return to the 1967 borders and to allow the right of return to all Palestinian refugees. In 2010, Hamas Prime Minister Ismail Haniyeh announced that Hamas would accept the outcome of a Palestinian referendum on a peace treaty with Israel even if the results were not in line with their ideology. Additionally he said that Hamas would "accept a Palestinian state on the borders of 1967, with Jerusalem as its capital, the release of Palestinian prisoners, and the resolution of the issue of refugees." This represented a departure from Hamas's earlier opposition to ceding any land of historic Palestine to Israel.

In 2012, Mousa Abu Marzook, a high-ranking Hamas official in competition with Haniyeh for Hamas' top leadership post, gave an interview in which he expressed a range of opinions, some of which differed from the organisation's actual stance. He said that Hamas will not recognize Israel and will not feel bound to understand a peace treaty negotiated by Fatah as a recognition of Israel, calling instead for a hudna (temporary truce). Abu Marzook echoed Haniyeh's demand that Palestinians should be given the unconditional right to return into what is now Israel proper.

== Prominent Palestinians ==
Rashid Abu Shbak, a senior PA security official declared, "The light which has shone over Gaza and Jericho [when the PA assumed control over those areas] will also reach the Negev and the Galilee [which constitute a large portion of pre-1967 Israel]."

The PA's Voice of Palestine radio station broadcast a Friday prayer sermon by Yusuf Abu Sneineh, official preacher at Jerusalem's Al-Aqsa Mosque, over the radio. In it, he asserted, "The struggle we are waging is an ideological struggle and the question is: where has the Islamic land of Palestine gone? Where [are] Haifa and Jaffa, Lod and Ramle, Acre, Safed and Tiberias? Where is Hebron and Jerusalem?"

PA cabinet minister Abdul Aziz Shaheen told the official PA newspaper, Al-Havat Al-Jadida, on January 4, 1998, "The Oslo accord was a preface for the Palestinian Authority and the Palestinian Authority will be a preface for the Palestinian state which, in its turn, will be a preface for the liberation of the entire Palestinian land."

Faisal Husseini, former Palestinian Authority Minister for Jerusalem, compared the Al-Aqsa Intifada following the Oslo peace process to the tactic of coming out of the Trojan Horse used by the Greeks in the myth of the Trojan War.

== See also ==
- Palestinian political violence#Palestinian attitudes
- Israeli views on the peace process
