= 2017 Arab League summit =

Meeting of Arab regional organization

The Arab League's 28th summit Jordan Summit
- Host country: Jordan
- Date: 29 March 2017
- Cities: Amman
- Follows: 2016
- Precedes: 2018
- Website: Official Website

The 2017 Arab League Summit was held near the Dead Sea in Jordan on 29 March 2017.

== Attendance.::. ==
=== Arab League States Representatives.::. ===
- Arab League – Secretary-General Ahmed Aboul Gheit
- Algeria – President of the Council of the Nation Abdelkader Bensalah
- Bahrain – King Hamad bin Isa Al Khalifa
- Comoros – President Azali Assoumani
- Djibouti – President Ismaïl Omar Guelleh
- Egypt – President Abdel Fattah el-Sisi
- Iraq – Prime Minister Haider al-Abadi
- Jordan – King Abdullah II of Jordan
- Kuwait – Sheikh Sabah Al-Ahmad Al-Jaber Al-Sabah
- Lebanon – President Michel Aoun

- Libya – Prime minister and Chairman of the Presidential Council Fayez al-Sarraj
- Mauritania – President Mohamed Ould Abdel Aziz
- Morocco – Minister of Foreign Affairs Salaheddine Mezouar
- Oman – Deputy Prime Minister Asaad bin Tariq Al Said
- State of Palestine – President of the PNA Mahmoud Abbas
- Qatar – Emir Tamim bin Hamad Al Thani
- Saudi Arabia – King Salman of Saudi Arabia
- Somalia – Vice-President Mohamed Abdullahi Mohamed
- Sudan – President Omar al-Bashir
- Syria – Vacant.::.
- Tunisia – President Beji Caid Essebsi

- United Arab Emirates – Ruler of Dubai and Prime Minister Mohammed bin Rashid Al Maktoum
- Yemen – President Abdrabbuh Mansur Hadi
- (Arab League) Arab Parliament – President Mishaal bin Fahm Al-Salami

=== Gusts & Participants.!!.::. ===
- African Union – Chairperson of the African Union Commission Moussa Faki
- (Organisation of Islamic Cooperation) Organisation of Islamic Conference – Secretary-General Youssef bin al-Ottaimeen
- United Nations – Secretary-General António Guterres
- European Union – High Representative of the Union for Foreign Affairs and Security Policy Federica Mogherini

== Amman Summit ==
The 2017 Amman Summit (also known as the 2017 Arab League Summit and the 28th Ordinary Session of the Arab League Council) and its preparatory meetings will take place between 23 and 29 March 2017, in the Dead Sea area of the Hashemite Kingdom of Jordan.

== History of Arab League Summit ==
In 1946, at the invitation of King Farouk of Egypt, leaders of the League of Arab States held their first summit at Inshas Palace in Egypt. The League's seven founding members participated: Jordan, Egypt, Saudi Arabia, Yemen, Iraq, Lebanon and Syria.

During the summit, which focused on the Palestinian cause, participating countries declared their intention to ‘consult, cooperate and work together in unity’ for the good of the Arab World. They also stressed the:

"Importance of utilizing all means possible to assist Arab peoples who were still under foreign rule to gain their independence and attain their nationalist aspirations to become active members of the League and United Nations."

Since the League's establishment in 1945 and up until 2016, Arab leaders have held a total of 39 summits, of which 27 were ordinary, nine were emergency (or extraordinary) and three were economic. Three of these summits were held in the Hashemite Kingdom of Jordan: The 11th Ordinary Summit in 1980, the 4th Extraordinary Summit in 1987 and the 13th Ordinary Summit in 2001.

In 2000, participants at the Extraordinary Arab Summit, which was hosted by Egypt, agreed to hold the Arab League Council at the Summit Level in an ordinary session in March of every year. This decision was first implemented at the Amman Summit in 2001, which took place on the 26th anniversary of the League's establishment.

The Hashemite Kingdom of Jordan is, once again, hosting Arab leaders at the 28th Ordinary Session and its preparatory meetings, embodying the Kingdom's constructive role in promoting joint Arab action.

== The Summit Venue ==
=== The Dead Sea Area ===
To the west of the Jordanian capital of Amman lies the Dead Sea: A rare, natural phenomenon famed for its high salinity and known as the lowest point on earth.

A few minutes’ drive from the Dead Sea to the east of the Jordan River lies the baptism site of Jesus Christ, which the Vatican has named an international destination for Christian pilgrimage. Moreover, to the east of the Dead Sea stands Mount Nebo, overlooking Israel, the occupied Palestinian territories, Southern Lebanon, Syria, and Egypt's Sinai.

=== King Hussein bin Talal Convention Centre at the Dead Sea ===
The Dead Sea area is home to a number of international hotels, resorts, tourist stops, therapeutic facilities, and conferences. At the heart of the area, among numerous five-star hotels, lies the King Hussein Bin Talal Convention Centre, which has become a destination for conference tourism and has been selected to host the Arab League Council at the Summit Level (the 28th Ordinary Session).

Established in 2004, the Centre's architectural style combines Islamic and modern architecture, with its stones and walls reflecting Jordan's environment in color and design. The three-storey center includes 27 halls of varying designs and sizes, equipped with the facilities and utilities required to hold conferences, making it an ideal location to host major events and conferences for the World Economic Forum, International Monetary Fund, United Nations and Arab League Summit.

== Amman Summit social media platforms ==
The Media Committee of the Arab Summit 2017 launched its official social media platforms on Facebook, Twitter and YouTube under the handle @ArabSummit2017. Launched for the first time as an interactive tool for Arab summits, these platforms aim to expand outreach to journalists and followers of the news and preparatory meetings of the Amman Summit, scheduled to take place between 23 and 29 March 2017.

These platforms seek to engage Arab youth – who comprise the largest segment in Arab societies – and allow them to weigh in on current Arab issues.
