= Israeli views on the peace process =

This article examines Israeli views of the peace process that is ongoing concerning the Israeli–Palestinian conflict. There are a multitude of opinions and views of the peace process elicited at various points during Israel's history and by a variety of people. A popular understanding of the origins of the conflict from the Israeli point of view is that it began following the 1967 Six-Day War with Israel's occupation of the territories and consequently the peace process negotiations should stem from this. However, there are other understandings of the conflict and therefore the solution for peace, including some Israeli academics' and peace activists' understanding that a much longer history is involved, differing from the popular narrative often recited. Suggestions for how to achieve peace in the region include a two state solution where an Israeli sovereign state and a Palestinian sovereign state exist side by side, or the suggestion of a one state secular solution where power is shared by Israelis and Palestinians. Hardliners believe that Israel should maintain sovereignty over the land it currently occupies and give no concessions to Palestinians, others believe keeping up the military campaign, occupation of the Gaza Strip and the West Bank and separation from Palestinians is the only current way forward. There is also a note of despair and uncertainness as to how to proceed among some, particularly following the failure of peace summits in the 1990s and early 21st century and the second Intifada, as Kaufman et al. have stated; "there is a growing consensus that the current political leadership are not able to build a stable peace and resolve the conflict between Israel and the Palestinian people". As Cowen says "almost everyone wants peace [but] on his or her terms" and this is the crux of the problem.

The article looks at the views demonstrated in Israel following particular attempts to create peace between Israel and Palestinian groups; such as the Oslo Accords, the Camp David 2000 summit and the Road Map for Peace. Also scrutinized are the views of key Israeli political figures and public opinions at particular points. This article intentionally only focuses on Israeli points of view and not Palestinian views (see: Palestinian views of the peace process), it is not a history of the peace process (see: Israeli–Palestinian peace process) or the conflict (see: history of the Israeli–Palestinian conflict) and it specifically looks at the Israeli–Palestinian conflict and peace process and not Israel's relations more generally with the Arab world (see: Arab–Israeli conflict; history of the Arab–Israeli conflict).

Almost every Israeli prime minister has called for peace talks with moderate Arab leaders over the years.

== Narratives of the conflict ==
The understanding given to the history of events between Israelis and Palestinians has a bearing on the solutions sought for peace and how far each side is prepared to compromise to create a peace deal.

=== Traditional narrative ===
What Slater terms the "traditional narrative" and Pappe calls the "common version" essentially refer to where Israelis place themselves in relation to Palestinians and the wider Arab world and in a particular version of past events. This "traditional" or "common" narrative, as the terms suggest, is both popular and well established in the mindset of many Israelis, both civilians and politicians alike and others outside of the state, particularly in the West. The narrative broadly holds that in the 1940s the Arabs were unwilling to negotiate and it was they who instructed their people to flee in 1948 creating the refugee problem that persists today. That there are a group of Palestinians who are terrorists who wish to destroy Israel and that the Palestinians are too demanding in their peace negotiations which reflects extremism within Palestinian society, and although the destruction of Israel was initially an aim of groups such as the Palestine Liberation Organization (PLO) and remains one for some such as Hamas, just as the idea of creating an Israeli state covering the occupied territories remains an aim for some Israelis, this has largely been rejected as an aim now and the PLO officially recognised Israel in 1988. Part of this traditional narrative is the belief that the causes of the conflict lie in the 1967 Six-Day War and consequently peace discussions should form around the discussion of territorial negotiation. Such a narrative leads to certain assumptions about what is acceptable in peace creation and influences how Israelis who hold this perception view the peace process. Slater goes as far as to say that, in his opinion, the conflict continues partly as a result of this "mythology" of Israel's situation in the Middle East and the Palestinian "other".

=== New narrative ===
There is an alternative to this traditional narrative: a growing scholarship from Israeli academics and peace activists looking at the history of relations between Israel and Palestine has developed what has become known as a "new history". Ilan Pappe's work referenced here can be considered part of this trend. It has reassessed Israel's role in conflict creation and continuation, demonstrating an awareness of both Israeli and Palestinian roles in the process. As a result of its understanding that the conflict reaches back beyond the Six-Day War, the narrative recognises different causes for the conflict to be beyond Palestinian anti-Semitism and towards Zionism's insistence on creating a Jewish state in Palestine for example, and consequently views the peace process differently; less fearfully of Palestinian intentions and more sympathetically to Palestinian wishes.

== Responses to peace attempts ==
The response by Israeli politicians and the general public to high-profile peace attempts give an indication of how these events, and therefore the peace process, have been viewed. Although separated here these peace process events are part of an ongoing process of negotiations, changing events and opinions.

=== The Oslo Accords ===
See Oslo Accords for details of the agreement.

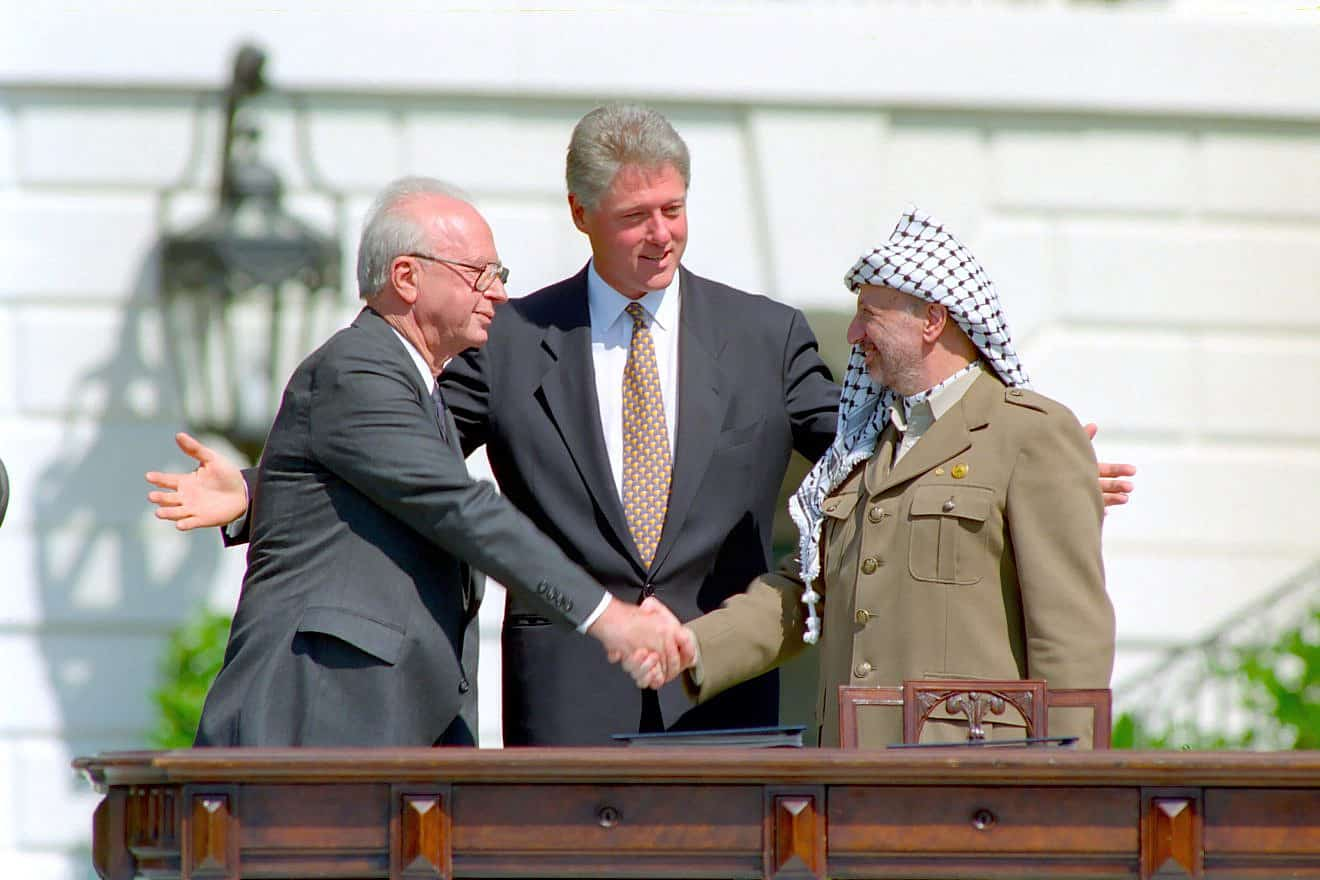
Yitzhak Rabin, Bill Clinton, and Yasser Arafat at the Oslo Accords signing ceremony on 13 September 1993

The agreement made in Oslo in August 1993 between Israel and the PLO was seen as a great step forward by many, although views of the Accords were not homogeneous. Some hailed Rabin's concession to consider the option of Palestinian self-rule as a welcome move towards peace and away from his hardliner background, others, both within rightwing Israeli politics and sections of society saw it as too great a concession on Israel's behalf. This view is demonstrated by the assassination of Rabin in 1995 by a rightwing radical Yigal Amir who opposed his signing the Oslo Accords and served to highlight the differences in opinion held within Israeli society as to the direction the peace process and consequently Israel should take. Suspicion of the reason for Palestinian agreement was held by a few who maintained the view that Palestinians wanted to destroy the state of Israel and that they would not attempt to keep the peace. The continued and increased attacks by some sectors of Palestinian society did nothing to aid the view that the Palestinians would not keep their side of the deal.

Israeli commentators lay blame for the failure of the Oslo Accords at Yasser Arafat's door believing his leadership to be corrupt and dictatorial rather than looking at events of Israel's making. The Oslo Accords, like previous talks had avoided key issues and the view of peace put forward by Israeli negotiators remained based on the notion of limited sovereignty over the Gaza Strip and the West Bank without resolving the right to return of Palestinian refugees from the 1948 conflict avoided the longer-term view of the causes of the conflict. The issue of Israeli settlements was not concluded, and the extensive building that took place following the Oslo Accords was cited as evidence that the views of Rabin and Israelis in power who did not act in the "spirit of Oslo". The issue of settlements throws up the particular and fairly extreme view of the religious-right in Israel at the time that believed negotiating over territory and the possibility of Palestinian self-rule in the religiously symbolic territories undermined what it meant to be Israeli. Settlers also viewed the peace process at this point as a threat due to the possibility that their homes and livelihoods would be at risk. The initial building of settlements and the continuation of such schemes, despite the Oslo Accords rhetoric demonstrates that those at the top of Israeli politics did not seriously envisage creating a viable Palestinian state as part of the peace process. For citizens outside the nationalist right the period around the Oslo Accords represented a time when negotiation over territory became acceptable on the understanding that the alternative was the probability that Israel would have to lose either its liberal democracy or Zionist identity.

=== Camp David 2000 Summit ===
See Camp David 2000 Summit for detail of the summit.

The Camp David summit in the summer of 2000 involving United States President Bill Clinton, Ehud Barak and Yasser Arafat, was an attempt to agree a deal to finalise issues that would create a peace settlement. Its outcome however was a deadlock and a rejection by Arafat of Barak's offer which offered most of Arafat's demands, withholding only the demand for sole Arab control over the temple mount, the demand for complete repatriation of millions of Arabs into Israel proper, and about 30% of the contested territory. According to Ben-Ami the left in Israel believed Barak and his team had not offered enough to the Palestinians to make it a viable option, and the right believed too many concessions were offered and that the failure of the peace process was what they had expected. A conflict of views on the peace process was clearly evident within Israel due mainly to traditional views on the character of Israel as a Jewish state, and a newfound desperation among some for peace at any cost.

Israeli left wing analysts have since put forward a version of events that imply Barak and his team did not go far enough to allow Arafat to comply and that far from blaming Arafat for rejecting a reasonable offer they hold empathy with the Palestinian predicament. Slater's view is that: "despite the widespread misrepresentation that Ehud Barak offered Palestinians 'generous' peace proposals at Camp David, Israel is still resisting the creation of a genuinely viable and independent Palestinian state." Highlighting the consistency throughout the peace process for him of a desire to maintain control over any threat to a Jewish state the Palestinians might have by controlling them. Barak did not acknowledge the role of Israel in the Palestinian refugee situation, highlighting his view of the peace process remains based in the traditional narrative understandings discussed at the top of this article. The collapse of the peace talks and the subsequent Second Intifada uprising left many Israelis to view the peace process as failing and having led to lives of greater insecurity and an increasing sense that the Palestinians ask for too much and offer violence in return and thus the two state solution with Israel's withdrawal to something like the 1967 borders that had seemed to be becoming a possibility became far more unlikely save for some academics and peace activists.

=== Road Map for Peace ===
See Road Map for Peace for detail of the negotiations.

The Road Map for Peace was introduced by George W. Bush's administration in co-operation with Russia, the European Union and the United Nations to try and instigate a phased path to peace. However the Road Map receive little genuine attention from either side of the conflict, other than, as Ben-Ami says, to keep the Americans onside, the real gain Israel received was the assurance of a removal of the military threats from other states in the region. Sharon's rightwing government were not keen to see a true revival of the peace process after a couple of years of the violence of the Second Intifada and paid it little more than lipservice.

== Political figures' view points ==
=== Shamir ===
Yitzhak Shamir, Israeli Prime Minister from 1983 to 1984 and again from 1986 to 1992 following a two-year spell as part of a coalition government between his Likud Party and the Labor Party, is considered one of the most hard-line Prime Ministers Israel has had. Accordingly, in a period of time where relations between Israel and other Arab states were beginning to shift and global changes were being witnessed towards the end of the Cold War, Shamir opposed shifts or compromise on the situation in the Israeli–Palestinian conflict. His view of the peace process at a time when the PLO were moving towards recognition of Israel and a two state solution was that territory should not be part of the negotiation and consequently with the moving times and relations obvious at the peace talks in Madrid he felt both under siege and indifference according to Ben-Ami.

=== Rabin ===
Yitzhak Rabin, a hardliner who had two terms as prime minister, was instrumental in the continuation of settlements and did not wish for the peace process to go in the direction of Israeli and Palestinian states existing next door to each other. However it was he who suggested an exchange of an end to the first intifada in return for Palestinian autonomy at the end of the 1980s. When Prime Minister for the second time, it was also his role in negotiations at Oslo that led to the so-called breakthrough in the peace process, acknowledging the PLO and the move towards Israeli withdrawal from the territories. His plans after the Oslo accords of continued settlement and road building in the occupied territories demonstrated his true views on the peace process; not a desire to return to 1967 borders but a separation in some form of Palestinians from Israelis. However it is suggested by Slater that towards the end of his life he was moving toward the idea of some kind of Palestinian state. Rabin also saw peace as essential for Israel to build up its economy and not only that but peace to increase regional development and standards of living not just in Israel.

=== Peres ===
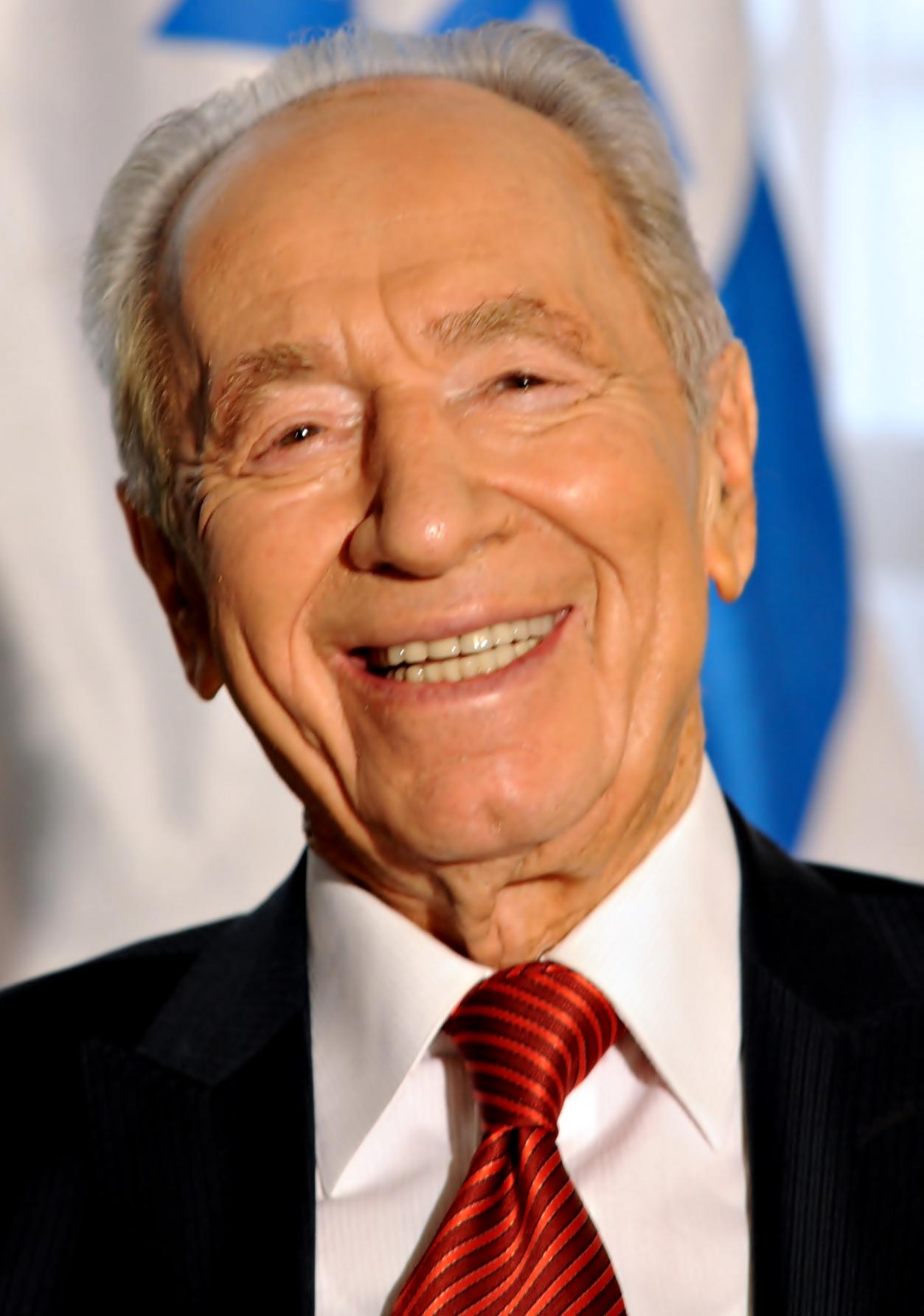
Shimon Peres

Shimon Peres has held many posts within Israeli politics, including the role of prime minister. He is credited as being a key instigator in the occurrence of the Oslo Accords and held many similar views towards the peace process as Rabin. The Camp David negotiations in 2000 brought Peres' criticism for the making of too many concessions for the Palestinians. For he held that a viable Palestinian state should not be formed and consequently stepped up the move to make inroads into Palestinian territories.

=== Netanyahu ===
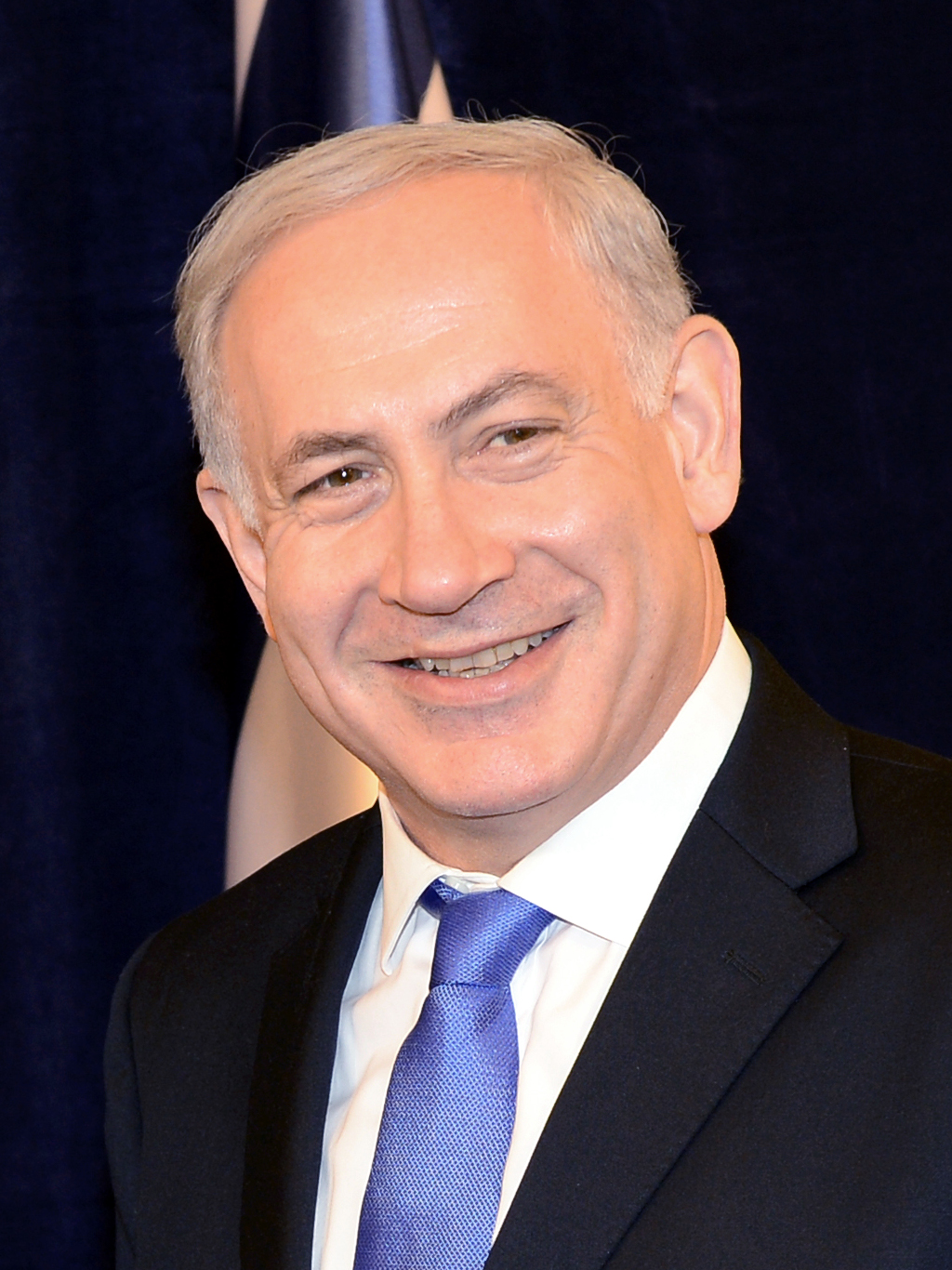
Benjamin Netanyahu

Benjamin Netanyahu became prime minister as leader of the Likud Party in 1996 and had an immediate effect, and an adverse one according to Yakan, on the peace process. He attempted to slow down the Oslo process in order to create better security and due to his severe reservations of it. Netanyahu is a recognised opponent of territorial negotiation and land for peace deals and he wanted results rather than declarations. The regard he and other Likud members held Rabin and Peres in following their negotiations with the PLO during the Oslo process demonstrates his view of the peace process as undesirable and as abandoning the notion of what Israel should be. He, like his successors in office, Barak and Sharon, believed that if the creation of some form of Palestinian state was completely unavoidable it should only be in the Gaza Strip, part of the West Bank, and Israel should remain the military and sovereign ruler over the settlements, all of Jerusalem and important points such as the aquifers.

=== Barak ===
Ehud Barak took office as prime minister in 1999 as leader of the Labor Party. His time in office and the decisions he made have been described as "schizoid" by Slater for the apparent changes in direction he took. He went further than any other Israeli Prime Minister in the deals he offered the Palestinians at Camp David, but he has himself described his loyalties to the rightwing—he had opposed the Oslo agreements—only making such peace offers out of pragmatism for the knowledge that controlling Palestinians was only going to lead to continued violence. After the failed negotiations and the concessions he offered, he continued to make reference to his desire for a Greater Israel. His view of the peace process therefore seem fairly contradictory and included placing importance on dealing with Israel's relations with its neighbours such as Syria over dealing directly with Israel's relations with the Palestinians in a hope that the Palestinians would become isolated if peace was secured between Israel and Syria. It was only once this channel was exhausted that Barak would deal with Arafat and the Palestinians. An important view point of Barak's regarding the peace process is that there were no preconceived solutions to the process and negotiations; for him there was not an expectation that Israel would definitely withdraw to the 1967 borders for example, everything was under discussion in an open ended process.

=== Sharon ===
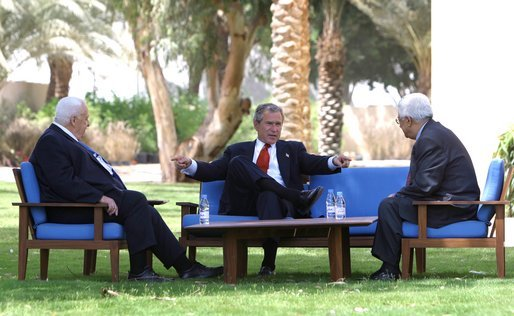
President George W. Bush, center, discusses the peace process with Prime Minister Ariel Sharon of Israel, left, and Palestinian President Mahmoud Abbas in Aqaba, Jordan, 4 June 2003.

Ariel Sharon succeeded Barak as prime minister in 2001 and brought with him a rightwing government in the face of the violent period of the second intifada. His reluctance to implement the goals of the 'Road Map for Peace' demonstrated his unwillingness to negotiate and make gestures towards developments in the peace process. Indeed, Ben-Ami says that Sharon has always harboured a hidden agenda: "the sterilization of the Palestinian national movement…and the confinement of a Palestinian homeland within scattered enclaves surrounded by Israeli settlements, strategic military areas and a network of bypass roads for the exclusive use of the Israeli occupier." As Sharon views a Palestinian national movement as a threat to Israel and its 'Jewishness'’ and consequently would rather allow an independent state, although militarily weak. The dismantling of settlements in Gaza, instigated by Sharon, represents not only an unprecedented step by Israel but also that Sharon had decided unilateral action rather than a two state negotiation was the way forward to move towards peace.

== Views from Israeli society ==
Israel is characterised by a multitude of opinions and views of the peace process that vary across time as well as across society. There are right-wing opinions (both secular and religious) which believe Israel should not concede to Palestinian demands and instead should maintain the original Zionist vision of Israel. There are those that hold left-wing viewpoints that believe Palestinians should have a sovereign state and Israel needs to go further in compromising to create peace; and there is a spread of people in between with varied views. For example, Israeli elites wanted peace in the 1990s so as to build Israel's economy and integrate into the global economy that was opening up in the post–Cold War period. The slowing down and deterioration of peace relations with Palestinians under Netanyahu's leadership frustrated many Israelis who view peace as a path to stability. Public opinions change, as Slater says, the notion of a withdrawal from the territories and Palestinians gaining their own state was unthinkable in most circles prior to the 1990s, however a decade later it was an accepted central theme of the peace process for many. The violence of the second intifada however has altered this opinion to a popular belief that this may no longer be a viable solution as military responses rather than negotiation has taken precedence.

A poll conducted in 2010 by Israel Democracy Institute suggested that 15% of right-wing Jewish Israelis and 16% of left-wing Jewish Israelis support a binational state solution over a two states solution based on 1967 lines. According to the same poll, 66% of Jewish Israelis preferred the two-state solution.

== Anti-peace terrorism ==
Fringe Israeli extremists have historically been opposed to the peace process. They fear that Israel would be forced to give too much land in the peace agreement, and show they opposition by using terrorism, which can be a real threat to any Israeli government pursuing peace. By example, in 1989–1990, the terrorist group Sicarii made arson and graffiti attacks, as well as death threats, against Jewish leftist political figures who supported the peace process. More recently, on August 10, 2003, a Jewish settler was arresting for threatening to kill Prime Minister Ariel Sharon.

Most violent opponents to the peace process were Kahanists, and have links to Meir Kahane's former Kach political party, which was outlawed as racist in 1988. Kahane, among other things, encouraged retaliatory violence against Arabs who attacked Jews.

== See also ==
- Israeli-Palestinian peace process
- Palestinian views of the peace process
- Israeli–Palestinian conflict
- History of the Israeli–Palestinian conflict
- Oslo Accords
- Camp David 2000 summit
- Road Map for Peace
