= Yossi Alpher =

Israeli writer

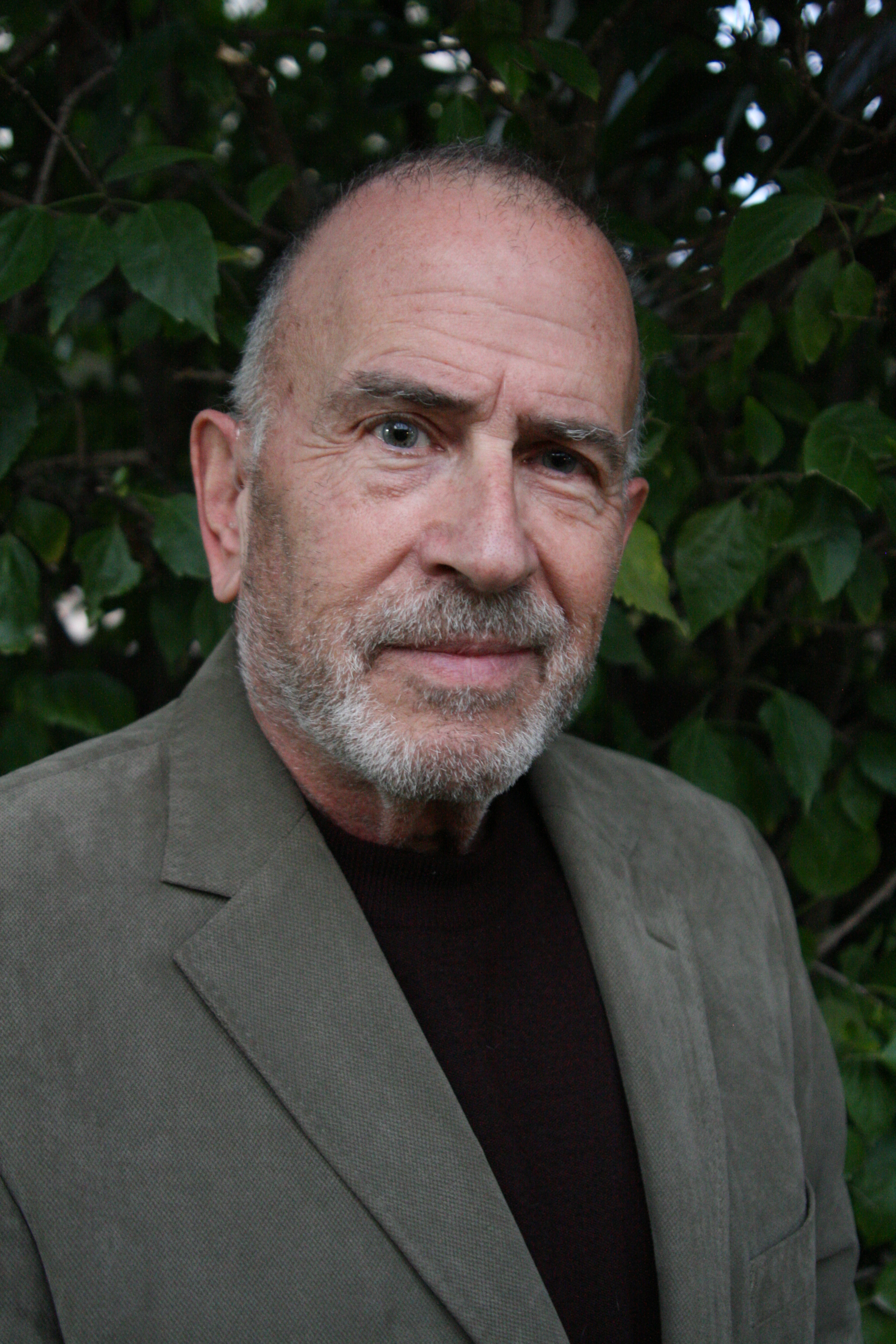
- Native name: יוסי אלפר
- Born: Joseph Alpher; 1942 (age 83–84) Washington, DC, USA
- Occupation: Writer, consultant, academic, journalist
- Education: Columbia University (BA)
- Notable awards: Simon Rockower Award (2007); Yitzhak Sadeh Prize (2016); INSS Tchechik Award (2017)

Yossi (Joseph) Alpher (Hebrew: יוסי אלפר) is an Israeli columnist and writer on Israel-related Middle East strategic issues. Alpher is best known as the author of the prize winning Periphery: Israel's Search for Middle East Allies, as well as coeditor of Bitterlemons in collaboration with Ghassan Khatib, a former vice president of Bir Zeit University. In recent years, Alpher has been extensively interviewed in documentaries about the Mossad.

== Biography ==
Alpher graduated from Columbia University in 1964 before serving in the Israel Defense Forces as an Intelligence officer, followed by service in the Mossad. From 1981 to 1995, he was associated with the Jaffee Center for Strategic Studies (JCSS) at Tel Aviv University, ultimately serving as director of the center. While at the Jaffee Center, Alpher coordinated and coedited the JCSS research project on options for a Palestinian settlement, and produced "The Alpher Plan" for an Israeli-Palestinian territorial settlement. From 1995 to 2000 he served as director of the American Jewish Committee's Israel/Middle East Office in Jerusalem. In July 2000 (during the 2000 Camp David Summit) he served as Special Adviser to the Prime Minister of Israel, working with Prime Minister Ehud Barak on the Israeli-Palestinian peace process.

Alpher writes Hard Questions, Tough Answers, a weekly security Q&A for Americans for Peace Now.

Yossi Alpher, ex-Mossad officer and Israeli analyst, appeared in Sacha Baron Cohen’s 2009 film Brüno. In the film, Brüno attempts to broker peace between Israelis and Palestinians. Alpher and Palestinian politician Ghassan Khatib were interviewed, unaware it was satire. Bruno asked absurd questions (e.g. confusing “Hamas” with “hummus”), leading to awkward and hilarious moments.

== Published works ==
- And The Wolf Shall Dwell With The Wolf: the Settlers and the Palestinians (Hakibbutz Hameuchad, 2001, Hebrew).
- Periphery: Israel's Search for Middle East Allies (Rowman & Littlefield, 2015).
- Medina Bodeda (Matar Publications, 2015, Hebrew).
- No End of Conflict: Rethinking Israel-Palestine (Rowman & Littlefield, 2016).
- Winners and Losers in the ‘Arab Spring’: Profiles in Chaos (Routledge, 2020).
