= Water supply and sanitation in Israel =

Data
- Access to an improved water source: 100% (2015)
- Access to improved sanitation: 100% (2015)
- Share of collected wastewater treated: Over 90%
- Continuity of supply: Very high
- Average urban water use (L/person/day): 137
- Average urban water and sanitation tariff (US$/m^{3}): 249.60 NIS (Dec. 2010) per 20m^{3}
- Share of household metering: Very high

Institutions
- Decentralization to municipalities: Yes (for water distribution and sanitation)
- National water and sanitation company: Mekorot (Bulk water supplier)
- Water and sanitation regulator: Governmental Authority of Water and Sewerage
- Responsibility for policy setting: Minister of Energy and Water Resources
- Sector law: Water Law 1959, amended most recently in 2006

Water supply and sanitation in Israel are intricately linked to the historical development of Israel, because rain falls only in the winter, and largely in the northern part of the country. Irrigation and water engineering are considered vital to the country's economic survival and growth. Large-scale projects to desalinate seawater, direct water from rivers and reservoirs in the north, make optimal use of groundwater, and reclaim flood overflow and sewage have been undertaken. Among them is the National Water Carrier, carrying water from the country's biggest freshwater lake, the Sea of Galilee, to the northern part of the Negev desert through channels, pipes and tunnels. Israel's water demand today outstrips available conventional water resources. Thus, in an average year, Israel relies for about half of its water supply from unconventional water resources, including reclaimed water and desalination. A particularly long drought in 1998–2002 had prompted the government to promote large-scale seawater desalination. In 2022, 86% of the country's drinkable water was produced through desalination of saltwater and brackish water.

As stated by Lifshitz, the director of the Israel Water Authority, in August 2025, the water authority issued a warning regarding a significant drought caused by record-high temperatures, diminished water resources, and the desiccation of northern streams, including the Banias Stream.

== Natural water resources ==
The main natural water resources of Israel are:

=== Mediterranean Sea ===
The by far largest part of drinkable water is being produced nowadays by desalination of seawater obtained from the Mediterranean Sea.

=== Water from the Jordan River basin ===
The Upper Jordan River flows south into the freshwater lake known as the Sea of Galilee, which provides the largest freshwater storage capacity along the Jordan River. The Sea of Galilee drains into the Lower Jordan River, which winds further south through the Jordan Valley to its terminus in the Dead Sea. A tributary of the Jordan River south of the lake is the Yarmouk River.

=== Groundwater ===
The main aquifers, or groundwater basins, are the Mountain Aquifer and the Coastal Aquifer, with smaller, regional aquifers in the Galilee and the Negev.

- The Mountain Aquifer consists of three basins:
  - The Western Aquifer, in Israel called the Yarkon-Taninim Aquifer, is the largest one, with an annual safe yield of 362 million cubic metres (mcm), based on average annual estimate, (of which 40 mcm are brackish). Eighty percent of the recharge area of this basin is located within the West Bank, whereas 80% of the storage area is located within Israeli borders. Israel utilises the aquifers of this basin by means of 300 deep groundwater wells to the west of the Green Line, as well as by deep wells within the West Bank boundary. Palestinians use it via wells and springs.
  - The North-Eastern Aquifer, in Israel called the "Gilboa-Bet She'an Aquifer" or "Schechem-Gilboa Aquifer", has an annual safe yield of 145 mcm (of which 70 mcm are brackish). Almost 100% of its water comes from precipitation falling within the West Bank area, but then flows underground in a northerly direction into the Bisan (Bet She'an) and Jezreel valley.
  - The Eastern Aquifer, whose waters empty into the Lower Jordan River and lay entirely within the West Bank, has an annual safe yield of 172 mcm (of which 70–80 mcm are brackish). This aquifer is mainly drained by springs.
- The Coastal Aquifer runs beneath the Israeli coastal plain, with Gaza downstream at the end of the basin.

== History ==
The history of the development of water supply and sanitation in modern Israel can be divided into distinct phases, beginning with the unilateral development of conventional water resources. This was followed by a period that emphasized the use of reclaimed water, the signing of an agreement to share water resources with Jordan and the Palestinian Authority, and the development of seawater desalination.

=== Development of conventional water resources (1937–70) ===
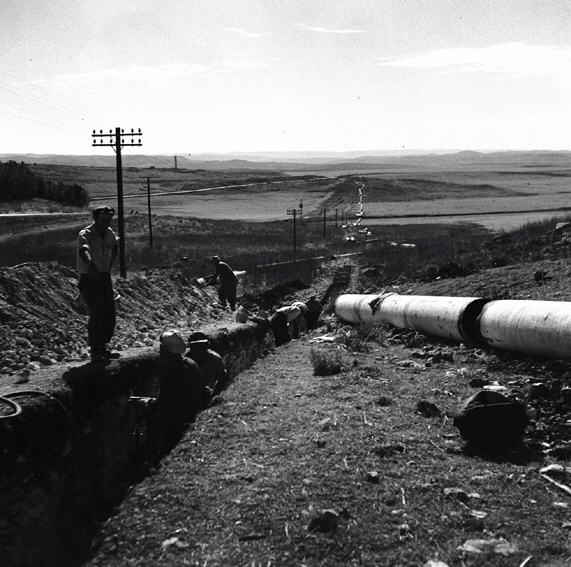
Laying water pipe to Jerusalem, c. 1946

Because the coastal plain had few water resources, Theodor Herzl already envisioned the transfer of water from the Jordan River to the coast for irrigation and drinking water supply. In 1937 the national water company Mekorot was created, more than a decade before the creation of the state of Israel. Among its achievements was the Shiloach Pipeline along the Burma Road to Jerusalem built during the 1948 Arab–Israeli War and a first pipeline to the Negev in 1955. Between 1953 and 1955 the United States Special Representative for Water in the Middle East, Eric Johnston, had negotiated the Jordan Valley Unified Water Plan to jointly develop the water resources of the Jordan River Basin between Israel, Lebanon, Syria and Jordan. The Johnston Plan was rejected by the Arab League, but Israel nevertheless abided by its water allocation under the plan. Mekorot began a Rain Enhancement program in 1961, increasing rainfall by 13–18%. A Brackish Water Pipeline to divert brackish ground water from the Sea of Galilee to the Lower Jordan was completed in 1965. The main water resources project at the time, however, was the transfer of water from the Sea of Galilee to the coast through the National Water Carrier in 1965. As a reaction to the construction of the pipeline, Lebanon, Syria and Jordan tried to divert the headwaters of the Jordan River. This was one of the events that increased tensions leading to the Six-Day War of 1967 during which Israel captured the West Bank and the Golan Heights.

=== Water reclamation (1970s and 80s) ===
In 1969, the Shafdan wastewater treatment plant south of Tel Aviv was completed to treat approximately 130 million cubic meters of wastewater per year for reuse in agriculture. However, wastewater from other cities and towns remained largely untreated. In 1970 there was a cholera outbreak because of illegal irrigation of lettuce with untreated wastewater. This gave rise to major investments in wastewater treatment under the National Sewerage Plan, which emphasized the reuse of treated wastewater. In 1984 the Kishon wastewater treatment plant was completed in Northern Israel. It provides 20 million cubic meters of treated wastewater per year for agricultural use in the fertile Jezreel Valley, maximizing distribution potential during high-demand periods.

=== Signing of water sharing agreements (1990s) ===
The 1995 Interim Agreement as part of the Oslo Peace Process provided certain quantities of water to the Palestinians, but prevents them from drilling any new wells in the Mountain Aquifer. The surface water of the Jordan River remains disputed with Syria, Lebanon and the Palestinians. Only with Jordan was Israel able to reach an agreement on the sharing of water resources under the terms of the two countries’ 1994 peace agreement Israel-Jordan Peace Treaty.

=== Seawater desalination (2000s) ===
In 1997, the first reverse osmosis desalination plant in Israel opened in Eilat. In 2002, under the impact of drought, the Government approved the construction of large seawater desalination plants along the Mediterranean coast. These installations would supply 305 million m^{3}/yr of desalinated water by the year 2010 and 500 million m³/yr by 2015. By mid-2008 two of the new plants with a capacity of 130 million m^{3}/yr were in operation. In parallel to the desalination program the cabinet also decided to promote water savings activities that could reduce household water use by at least 10 percent. In 2012, the Ashkelon Desalination Plant was converting 15,000 to 16,000 cubic meters of seawater to fresh water every hour, supplying 15 percent of Israel's annual water supply.

In July 2007 Water Commissioner Uri Shani warned about a decline in rainfall, exacerbating Israel's water crisis. "The drop in water supply derives from atmospheric contamination, which affects cloud composition and causes a drop in rainfall levels. Every year we record less water entering Lake Kinneret in the winter. Another factor in the drop in water supply is contamination of the coastal aquifer, which reduces the amount of water that can be pumped out."

In 2007 Mekorot inaugurated its advanced Central Filtration Plant at the company's Eshkol facility. Built at a cost of more than $100 million, the sophisticated plant has annual filtering capacity in excess of 500 million cubic meters per year. It is the largest plant of its type in Israel and one of the largest in the world. In 2008 Mekorot lay a fifth pipeline to Jerusalem to double the quantity of water and provide 150 million cubic meters annually, including desalinated water. In March 2008 National Infrastructures Minister Benjamin Ben-Eliezer and Water Authority head Uri Shani began to explore options for new wastewater treatment plants and reservoirs. Another alternative considered was more expensive but less land-intensive membrane bioreactors. In 2006 the Dan Regional Wastewater Board was criticized for plans to incinerate sludge to replace the practice of dumping it into the sea. Critics said the sludge should be used as fertilizer in agriculture.

In July 2008, in the middle of another drought, the Knesset established a state commission of inquiry into the slow progress of desalination. Desalination capacity was less than a third of the amount set by the cabinet, mostly due to a slowdown in tenders after a few years of relatively high rainfall. The planned water-saving activities were stopped completely and were resumed only in 2006, but at a slow pace. However, a vigorous water savings campaign was then started featuring videos by famous Israelis such as singer Ninet Tayeb, model Bar Refaeli and actor Moshe Ivgy. The campaign resulted in reducing water use by more than 10 percent, saving the construction of a desalination plant. In its final report in March 2010 the commission of inquiry, headed by former judge Dan Bein, concluded that changes were needed in the Water Law of 1959. The Finance Ministry was accused of having delayed desalination plans arguing that conservation and wastewater reuse should have been implemented first. Only years later, the ministry endorsed large-scale desalination. The Water Authority was said to have been slow, non-transparent and that it failed to coordinate with various ministries. Infrastructure Minister Uzi Landau endorsed the report and announced that his Ministry would submit a bill to curtail the Water Authority's powers and to put it more firmly under the control of his Ministry.

=== New National Water System (2009 onwards) ===
In January 2009 Mekorot said it would invest more than NIS 2 billion (US$500 million) in a new National Water System with several east–west arteries relying on pumping, complementing and partly substituting for the National Water Carrier running from north to south that relied on gravity. The new pipelines would connect the five new desalination plants along the coast with water users. The project would include the construction of 100-kilometer water channels, advanced quality control and command systems, and water reservoirs. When completed, most drinking water supplied to Israel's residents from Hadera southwards – in other words, most of the country's population – would come from desalinated seawater.

By 2014, Israel's desalination programs provided roughly 35% of Israel's drinking water and it is expected to supply 40% by 2015 and 70% by 2050. In recent years, Israel's annual use of water from the Sea of Galilee has shrunk from 513 million cubic meters (in 2001–2002) to just 25 million cubic meters (2018–19) as desalinated water has taken its place.

== Water resources ==
Water resources in Israel consist of conventional water resources (surface water, groundwater) and non-conventional water resources including the reuse of treated wastewater (reclaimed water), seawater desalination and the desalination of brackish water.

=== Conventional water resources ===
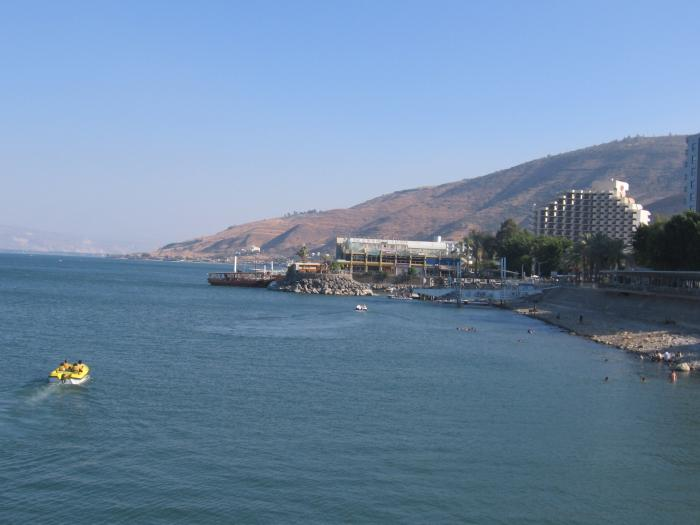
Sea of Galilee

Historically, Israel had about 1,780 million cubic meters of conventional freshwater and brackish water resources at its disposal in an average year. More than half of these resources consisted of inflows from the Golan Heights (275 million), Lebanon (310 million) and the West Bank (345 million). 92 percent of the conventional water resources were considered economically exploitable, the rest being excess floodwaters. The usable amount consisted of about 1.1 billion cubic meters of groundwater and springs and 0.6 billion from surface water. About 80% of the water resources are located in the north of the country and only 20% in the south. However, average rainfall has declined, possibly as a result of climate change, so that conventional water resources are now estimated at less than 1,336 million cubic meters in an average year (arithmetic mean) over the period 1975–2011. The median was even lower at 1,202 million cubic meters per year.

The security of these resources is impacted by riparian conflicts. Several hundred million cubic meters of groundwater in the West Bank Mountain Aquifer are disputed between Israel and the Palestinians. Under the 1995 Interim Agreement as part of the Oslo Peace Process, Israel provided 52 million cubic meters of water to the Palestinians in 2011, but prevents them from drilling new wells in the Mountain Aquifer. The surface water of the Jordan River remains disputed with Syria, Lebanon and the Palestinians. Only with Jordan was Israel able to reach an agreement on the sharing of water resources in 1995 as part of the Israel-Jordan Peace Treaty. 48 million cubic meters of water per year were provided to Israel under the Peace Treaty in 2011.

Successive years of drought from 1998 to 2002 had dramatically lowered water levels in all of the main reservoirs. 1998–1999 was the worst drought year in Israel for the past 100 years. The following years were also characterized by less-than-average rainfall, which led to a shortfall of some half a billion cubic meters in Israel's water balance each year, in comparison to an average year. The winters of 2002–03 and 2003–04 were characterized by average and higher-than-average rainfall, which led to a significant rise in the water level of the Sea of Galilee and in the collection of floodwater in catchment reservoirs. However, the country's aquifers have remained depleted. It was estimated in 2003 that increased water demand and decreased water availability has led to a cumulative deficit of nearly 2 billion cubic metres. In 2008 another drought occurred.

The Sea of Galilee and the Coastal Aquifer are Israel's main water storage facilities, with a combined storage capacity of about 2 billion cubic meters. The coastal aquifer is used for artificial groundwater recharge.

=== Artificial groundwater recharge ===
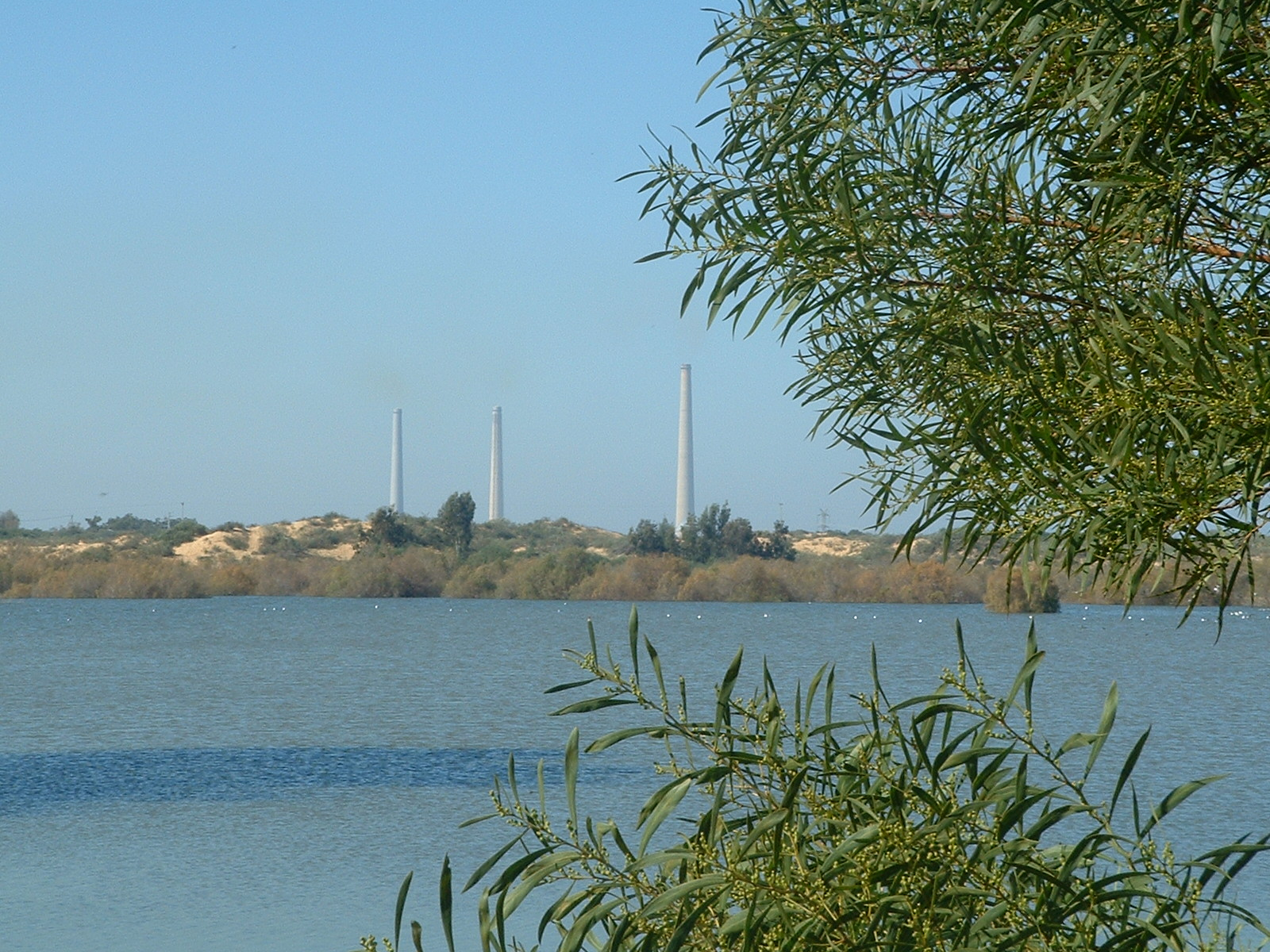
Menashe groundwater recharge project reservoir

Artificial groundwater recharge is practiced extensively in Israel from flood water, potable water from the National Water Carrier and treated wastewater. Artificial recharge has increased groundwater levels in the Coastal Aquifer and counteracted further seawater intrusion. Groundwater recharge from flood water is done by collecting runoff from winter rains in a drainage basin and directing it into recharge ponds. The groundwater is then pumped back up during summer through wells around the recharge ponds. The cost of the recharge process is limited to maintenance, with pumping costs amounting to only $0.02–0.03 per cubic meter. About 40–50% more water than the average recharge is pumped from the aquifer in order to create a temporary hydrological depression that creates space for artificial recharge the following winter.

The largest recharge plant in Israel is the Menashe plant in the Northern coastal plain, which is operated by Mekorot. The drainage basin of the Menashe plant is 189 square kilometers, capturing about 12 million cubic meters in an average year.

=== Reclaimed water ===
As of 2010, Israel leads the world in the proportion of water it recycles. Israel treats 80% of its sewage (400 billion liters a year), and 100% of the sewage from the Tel Aviv metropolitan area is treated and reused as irrigation water for agriculture and public works. In 2012 the Dan Region Wastewater Treatment Plant was cited as a global model by the United Nations. The plant, known locally as Shafdan, was lauded for its unique method of using the natural filtration qualities of sand to improve the quality of sewage. In 2010, about 400 million cubic metres/year of treated wastewater was reused, primarily in agriculture. This constitutes about 40% of water use in agriculture.

Israel has a modern sanitation system that includes 120 wastewater treatment plants in Israel. The three largest plants are: Dan Region Plant (120 million cubic metres/year) using activated sludge and nutrient removal, with reuse in the Western Negev; Haifa Plant (37 million cubic metres/year), with reuse in the Jezreel valley; and Jerusalem Sorek Plant (23 million cubic metres/year), located in the basin of the Sorek River.

Many of the smaller wastewater treatment plants are waste stabilization ponds, a low-cost and low-energy treatment that eliminates pathogens while conserving nutrients. An example is the Arab village of Kafr Manda in the Western Galilee, whose wastewater is being treated and reused for irrigation in the neighboring Jewish community of Yodfat.

However, a report released by the Israel Union for Environmental Defense in 2010 found that 500,000 homes in Israel are not linked to a central sewage system. The vast majority of these homes are in 150 Arab communities which have no sewage hook-up and whose waste is therefore discharged into cesspits or the local environment. Jerusalem and Ariel were reported as dumping some of their refuse into streams. Overall, only 2.7% of raw sewage flows into streams and none into the sea.

As of 2010, Israel leads the world in the proportion of water it recycles. Israel treats 80% of its sewage (400 billion liters a year), and 100% of the sewage from the Tel Aviv metropolitan area is treated and reused as irrigation water for agriculture and public works. The remaining sludge is currently pumped into the Mediterranean, however a new bill has passed stating a conversion to treating the sludge to be used as manure. Only 20% of the treated water is lost (due to evaporation, leaks, overflows and seeping). The recycled water allows farmers to plan ahead and not be limited by water shortages. There are many levels of treatment, and many different ways of treating the water—which leads to a big difference in the quality of the end product. The best quality of reclaimed sewage water comes from adding a gravitational filtering step, after the chemical and biological cleansing. This method uses small ponds in which the water seeps through the sand into the aquifer in about 400 days, then is pumped out as clear purified water. This is nearly the same process used in the space station water recycling system, which turns urine and feces into purified drinking water, oxygen and manure. Almost 90% of the nation's wastewater effluent, or almost 50% of all the water used by farmers nationally, is processed for reuse in agriculture. Because freshwater is so limited, drinking and other household needs take precedence over the use of reclaimed water for agriculture.

To add to the efficiency of the Israeli system – the reclaimed sewage water may be mixed with reclaimed sea water (plans are in action to increase the desalinization program up to 50% of the country's usage by 2013 – 600 billion liters of drinkable sea water a year), along with aquifer water and fresh sweet lake water – monitored by computer to account for the nationwide needs and input. This action reduced the outdated risk of salt and mineral percentages in the water. Plans to implement this overall usage of reclaimed water for drinking are discouraged by the psychological preconception of the public for the quality of reclaimed water, and the fear of its origin.

As of today, all the reclaimed sewage water in Israel is used for agricultural and land improvement purposes.

=== Seawater desalination ===
In early 2002, under the impact of drought, the government approved the construction of large seawater desalination plants along the Mediterranean coast. These installations would supply 500 million m^{3}/yr by 2015. The government's goal is to reach a capacity of 750 million m^{3}/year by 2020. All projects were to be executed by the private sector, through international tenders. At the end of 2013 four plants, with a total capacity of almost 500 million m^{3}/year per year, were operational. All plants use reverse osmosis, utilizing self-generated power.

The Ashkelon seawater reverse osmosis (SWRO) desalination plant was the largest in the world when it was commissioned. The project was developed as a BOT (Build-Operate-Transfer) by a consortium of three international companies: Veolia water, IDE Technologies and Elran. In March 2006, it was voted 'Desalination Plant of the Year' in the Global Water Awards.

The NIS 1.5 billion (US$375 million) financing of the Hadera plant was led by a consortium of foreign banks with 50% financed by the European Investment Bank (EIB), 25% by the French Calyon Corporate and Investment Bank and 25% by Banco Espírito Santo (BES), a Portuguese investment bank.

The construction of the plant in Ashdod by Mekorot had been delayed by an injunction in court from the private company IDE which had built the Ashkelon plant. It alleged that the contract had been awarded to Mekorot without a tender. In June 2008, the Tel Aviv District Court decided that IDE was right. In February 2009 Mekorot Development and Initiatives Ltd, a subsidiary of Mekorot, published an international tender for the planning and construction of the plant. The tender foresees an option for the winner to become a partner in the special project company controlled by Mekorot that will carry out the project, and in the project operating and maintenance company, with a stake of up to 40%.

In November 2021, Jordan and Israel signed an agreement brokered by the United Arab Emirates by which a UAE company will build a solar power plant in Jordan from which Israel will buy electricity in exchange for water from an Israeli desalination plant. Israel produces 86% of the country's drinkable water, which is distributed by municipal and regional utilities, via large-scale desalination of saltwater and brackish water.

In October 2025, Israel initiated a project to replenish the diminishing water level in the Sea of Galilee using desalinated water. The effort began by pumping 1,000 cubic metres (35,000 cu ft) of water per hour, which was increased in March 2026 to 4,000 cubic metres (140,000 cu ft) per hour. The water is sent from plants near the Mediterranean Sea over land via the Reverse Carrier to the Tzalmon Stream in Ein Ravid, where it replenishes local water supplies and makes its way to the Sea of Gallilee.

Existing Israeli water desalination facilities
Location	Opening	Capacity (mln m^{3}/year)	Cost of water (per m^{3})	Operator	Notes
Eilat	1970s	3			
Ashkelon	August 2005	120	NIS 2.60	VID (BOT)	
Palmachim	May 2007	90 (est. 2015)	NIS 2.90	Via Maris (BOO)	
Hadera	December 2009	145	NIS 2.60	H2ID (BOT)	
Soreq	August 2013	150 (expansion up to 300 approved)	NIS 2.01–2.19	SDL (BOT)	
Ashdod	Mid-2015	100 (expansion up to 150 possible)	NIS 2.40	Mekorot	
Soreq 2	March 2025	200	NIS 1.45	IDE	

Israeli water desalination facilities under construction
Location	Opening	Capacity (mln m^{3}/year)	Cost of water (per m^{3})	Operator	Notes
Nahariya	2025	100		IDE	

In 2004, a representative of the Israeli Water Commission had suggested at an international conference to use 50 million m^{3}/year from the desalination plant in Hadera for the exclusive supply of up to one million Palestinians in the Northern West Bank.

Environmental groups, such as the Israel Union for Environmental Defense, have called for a moratorium on new desalination plants, beyond the ones already in the advanced bidding stages. "We believe that even in 2020, we can make do with desalination 315 million cubic meters", a report says. It calls for water conservation, the treatment of wastewater and the recycling of greywater, as well as using construction techniques that allow rainwater to percolate into underground water reservoirs. The authors of the report claim that this would reduce the need for massive desalination of seawater and the environmental damage it causes, including the emission of greenhouse gases. In October 2011 the Water Authority published a Master Plan for Desalination in Israel.

==== High iodine deficiency rate ====
In March 2017, a national survey was published that concluded that there is an extremely high rate of serious iodine deficiency among the Israeli population, and in particular among pregnant women (85%) and school-age children (62%). The researchers mentioned the lack of a national salt iodisation program and the heavy dependence on iodine-depleted desalinated seawater as reasons for this major public health problem. The concerns include a "high risk of maternal and fetal hypothyroidism and impaired neurological development of the fetus", and the professor leading the study stated that iodine deficiency has lowered the IQ level of Israeli children by four to five points over the past 50 years.

=== Brackish water desalination ===
In addition to these large plants, there are around 30 small mostly brackish water desalination plants that desalinate about 30 million m^{3}/year. Most of these installations are in the Arava and the Negev. The largest of them (~11 million m^{3}/year) is located in Eilat and desalinates brackish water and Red Sea water for use of the city's inhabitants. The first desalination installations were established in Israel in 1965.

According to other reports Israel desalinated only around 16,500 cubic meter/day (m^{3}/d) of brackish water in 2008, corresponding to 6 million m^{3}/year. In 2008 the government planned to increase this capacity more than 13-fold to somewhere between 220,000 m^{3}/d and 274,000 m^{3}/d by 2012. Some plants are intended to help to rehabilitate the southern part of the coastal aquifer, which has been adversely affected by salinity due to overextraction. As of 2014, twelve such installations were operational, desalinating 66 million m^{3}.

In addition, a desalination facility with a capacity of 54,800 m^{3}/d–82,200 m^{3}/d is planned in the Western Galilee. In Nitzanim in southern Israel, a plan is being studied for increasing the size of the 9,600 m^{3}/d desalination plant.

=== Rainwater harvesting ===
The Southwest Center for the Study of Hospital and Healthcare Systems in cooperation with Rotary International is sponsoring a rainwater harvesting model program across the country. The first rainwater catchment system was installed at an elementary school in Lod, Israel. The project is looking to expand to Haifa in its third phase. The Southwest Center has also partnered with the Water Resources Action Project of Washington, D.C., which currently has rainwater harvesting projects in the West Bank. Rainwater harvesting systems are being installed in local schools to educate schoolchildren about water conservation principles and bridge divides between people of different religious and ethnic backgrounds, all while addressing the water scarcity issue that the Middle East faces.

== Water use ==
Water use in 2009 was 1.91 billion cubic meters of which fresh water use was 1.26 billion cubic meters. Water use was 100 million cubic meters (5.2%) to Jordan and the Palestinian Authority, 1016 million cubic meters for agriculture(53.2%), 684 million cubic meters (35.8%) for domestic and public uses and 110 million cubic meters (5.7%) for industrial use. According to one estimate, average domestic water consumption in Israel is 137 litres per person per day on average, about half of indoor water use in the United States. However, according to another estimate water use per person per year is 90 cubic meters, corresponding to 247 litres per day. The latter estimate includes losses and probably also water use by offices that may not have been included in the former figures.

Water shortage is a problem in Israel, however the country has managed to ensure the availability of clean drinking water for its citizens, but also to have a surplus of water that it sells to nearby nations like Jordan. Israel has been able to do this by utilizing desalination, reclaimed water, and other non-traditional water sources in addition to its natural supplies. Its 86 m^{3} renewable yearly water per capita is far less than the 500 m^{3} threshold that characterizes extreme shortage.

== Service quality ==
According to the Ministry of Environment, 97.9% of the tests complied with drinking water quality standards. An analysis of results since 1989, when disinfection of groundwater was first introduced, has shown a constant improvement in the quality of drinking water, with the percentage of violations decreasing from 8.4% in 1989 to 2.1% in 1999. In 2000, the Minister of Health signed an amended version of public health regulations which raise chemical standards for water quality to very stringent standards. Maximum levels for 38 new chemical substances—including pesticides, organic solvents and petroleum products—were set for the first time while existing standards for nitrates, lead, cadmium and zinc were tightened.

The salinity of supplied water in Israel varies from very low salinity water (10 mg/L of chlorides) from the Upper Jordan River, 200 mg/L from the Sea of Galilee, and more than 1500 mg/L from groundwater sources in the south.

== Responsibility for water supply and sanitation ==
Responsibilities for the water and sanitation sector in Israel are defined in two key laws: The Water Law of 1959, amended most recently in 2006, and the Water and Sewerage Corporations Law of 2001.

=== Policy and regulation ===
The Minister of Energy and Water Resources (until 2012 the Minister of Infrastructures) is the Cabinet member responsible to the Parliament (the Knesset) for the management of water resources, proposing the national water policy for Cabinet approval and subsequently implementing it, as well as for Israel's external water relations. Since some aspects of the management, protection and allocation of water resources fall into the spheres of other Ministries, the exercise of certain powers requires their consent. The principal Ministries in that category are the Ministries of Agriculture (agricultural allocations and pricing), Environmental Protection (water quality standards), Health (drinking water quality), Finance (tariffs and investments) and the Interior (urban water supply). The Administration for the Development of Sewage Infrastructures, a unit in the Ministry of Energy and Water Resources, implements government policy in the field of development of sanitation. Long-term planning for the supply and sanitation is included in the National Outline Plan.

With the 2006 amendment to the Water Law the Governmental Authority of Water and Sewerage (the "Water Authority") was created. The Water Authority is an inter-agency body overseen by a council composed of senior representatives of the Ministries of Finance, Energy and Water, Environmental Protection and Interior. The director of the authority (formerly the "Water Commissioner") is a cabinet-appointed civil servant reporting to the Minister of Energy and Water and to the Knesset. He is nominated by the Cabinet for a period of five years. There also is a Water Board, which is composed of representatives of the Government and the public (producers, suppliers and consumers), whose consent/advice must be obtained for certain measures. Past and present water commissioners or directors of the Water Authority include Meir Ben Meir (1996–2000), Shimon Tal (2001–2006), Uri Shani (2006–2011) and Alexander Kushnir (since 2011).

=== Bulk water supply through Mekorot ===
The state-owned National Water Company (Mekorot) is responsible for bulk water supply through the National Water Carrier, transferring water from the Sea of Galilee and other sources mainly to the coastal plain. Mekorot supplies 1.5 billion cubic meters of water in an average year, 70% of Israel's entire water supply and 80% of its drinking water. It supplies water to about 4,800 intermediary water providers, including municipalities, regional associations, agricultural settlements and industrial consumers. It also operates 31 desalination plants treating nearly a million cubic meters of seawater and brackish water every day. The company's eight wastewater treatment plants, including the Dan Regional Wastewater Treatment Plant, treat 40% of all Israel's wastewater. Its nine reclamation plants enable 70% of the treated effluent to be reused for agriculture. In 2007 the structure of Mekorot has been changed. The parent company, "Mekorot Water", continues to produce, transport and supply water. One of its subsidiaries, "Mekorot Ventures and Development", concentrates, among other things, on the desalination of seawater, wastewater treatment, projects for the municipal sector and projects abroad. Another subsidiary focuses on building and maintaining water infrastructures, primarily for the parent company. Mekorot also serves in some cases also as a Regional Water Authority. A Regional Water Authority does not have to be owned or controlled by the Government and may be owned either privately or by municipalities.

=== Water distribution and sanitation ===
Water distribution and sanitation is the responsibility of 52 regional water and sewer corporations that serve 132 local authorities with 5.5 million inhabitants. Outside their service area local authorities provide services directly to customers.

Local authorities consist of 76 cities (with a population ranging from 2,500 to 750,000 inhabitants), 144 local councils in small towns and 53 regional councils in rural areas. The Water and Sewerage Corporations Law of 2001 provides for the creation of regional companies to which local authorities would gradually transfer their water and sewerage services. The 2001 Law aims at, inter alia, full cost recovery and the promotion of private sector investments for infrastructure. The transfer of service provision from municipalities to public service entities (called "Water and Sewerage Corporations") is initially voluntary, but at a later stage it will become compulsory. It had been initially envisaged that by 2010 all municipal water and sewerage services would have been transferred to Water and Sewerage Corporations. The Corporations may serve the area of one or more municipality, although in the latter case all municipalities in the service coverage area have to agree. The Corporations have quality of service obligations and are required to obtain a permit from the Ministry of the Interior. The Corporations may be owned either by the municipality (ies) in whose service area they operate or by private investors. The Government may intervene in the operation of the corporation, including transferring the provision of the services to another entity in case of failure in service provision, including in case of bankruptcy. The aim was to have only about 15 large regional water and sanitation companies. However, 52 companies had been established as of 2010 because mayors resisted the establishment of larger regional companies.

An example of a multi-municipal utility that precedes the 2001 law is the Dan Regional Sewerage Board (Shafdan), which includes seven municipalities in and around Tel Aviv. It owns the Dan wastewater treatment plant, the largest wastewater treatment plant in the country which treats about 130 million cubic meters of wastewater annually for reuse in agriculture (see under reclaimed water). Mekorot operates the plant on behalf of Shafdan.

== Financial aspects and efficiency ==
In Israel water tariffs are levied for all uses and at all stages of production, from groundwater abstraction, to bulk water sales to final users. Investments are financed both through self-financing from water sales revenues, through commercial debt and through various subsidies paid to municipalities and to Mekorot. From 2010 to 2012 regional water companies distributed the equivalent of $55 million in profits to their municipal shareholders. mid-2014, the Ministry of Energy and Water planned to present a law to Parliament that would allow utilities to return profits to their customers in the form of refunds.

=== Fees and tariffs ===
Domestic water tariffs charged by local authorities are set by the Ministers of Interior and Finance. They are progressive (increasing-block) tariffs. The first block is for the initial 3.5 cubic meters per month for each housing unit and was set at NIS 9.09 ($2.43) in 2013, with higher consumption charged at NIS 14.60 per cubic meter. In condominiums apartments usually have their own meters. In 2005 the average household expenditures on water stood at 0.9% of total household consumption expenditures. In June 2013 the Finance Ministry and the Council of Local Authorities reached agreement that the base water tariff will be reduced by 5% by the end of 2015. Water tariffs had gone up by over 30% in previous years.

Abstraction Fees In 1999, during a severe drought, it was decided that all those extracting water from water sources would be charged with an extraction levy. The obligation for payment of the extraction levy falls on the extractor who can pass the costs on to the consumers.

Mekorot bulk water tariffs The prices Mekorot is entitled to charge are the rates set by the Ministers of Energy and Water and Finance, approved by the Knesset's finance committee, and updated from time to time according to the changes in the Consumer Price Index, electricity rates and the average wage index. The rates are categorized by the different uses: domestic, consumption and services, industry and agriculture. The rates for industrial and agriculture uses are lower than those for domestic consumption and services. Water for agriculture is supplied on a less reliable basis and is of poorer quality. Subsidies are provided for agriculture and for remote and elevated localities. The bulk water tariff for a specific use is the same throughout the country, irrespective of the difference in costs of supplying water to a specific locality. Mekorot bulk water tariffs were increased by 25% in January 2010, to a large extent to absorb increases in electricity prices. Energy accounts for an ever-larger share of water supply costs because of the increasing share of seawater desalination.

=== Investment ===
The total investment in the sector consists of investments by Mekorot in bulk water supply (including water supply for domestic uses, industry and agriculture), as well as investments by municipalities in drinking water distribution, sewerage and wastewater treatment. If half of the Mekorot investments of US$240 million in 2006 can be attributed to domestic water supply (US$120 million), and US$125 million were invested by municipalities in sanitation (see below), total investments in drinking water supply and sanitation stood at least US$245 million per year, excluding investments in desalination plants under BOO schemes and excluding investments in drinking water distribution by municipalities.

=== Financing ===
Municipalities receive grants and soft loans in order to finance investments, particularly in wastewater treatment. These subsidies are channeled through various funds, such as the Water Networks Rehabilitation Fund, the National Sewage Program and the Wastewater Renovation and Reuse Program. The State invests about NIS 450 million per year (about US$125 million) in sanitation through these funds, mostly in the form of long term subsidized loans (20 years, 5% interest), and some in the form of grants.

Mekorot receives a subsidy from the Ministry of Finance to cover the difference between its supply costs and the tariffs it is allowed to charge to its customers. Between 1993 and 1999 government support to Mekorot declined from 40% to 23% of its turnover, to a large extent because of an increase in the efficiency of Mekorot. This has been induced by a change introduced in 1994, whereby Mekorot's tariffs were not set any more under a cost-plus formula, but a 2.5% annual factor for efficiency increases was built into the tariff formula.

Most large-scale seawater desalination plants are being privately financed as BOT projects. The Hadera plant, for example, is led, for the first time, by a consortium of foreign banks, and amounts to NIS 1.5 billion according to the following breakdown: 50% The European Investment Bank (EIB); 25% the French Calyon Corporate and Investment Bank, which specializes in long-term projects; 25% Banco Espírito Santo (BES), a Portuguese investment bank.

=== Mekorot finances ===
Throughout its history, the Mekorot has been financially stable according to information published on its website. In 2006, Mekorot's turnover was over $700 million, shareholders' equity was $500 million and total assets were in excess of $2.8 billion. In 2006, Mekorot invested over $240 million in developing water facilities, including a new central filtration plant, compared with $180 million in investments in 2005. For a number of years Mekorot's fundraising instruments (primarily, bond offerings) have been awarded the highest AAA rating by the Ma'alot credit rating agency based on the following factors: Because tariffs established by the government are low and do not cover Mekorot's operating costs, the company receives compensation for the difference between what it costs to produce a unit of water and what it is allowed to charge. The level of subsidies is fixed in multi-annual agreements, the first one having covered the period 1993–98, the second one 1998–2006 and the third one for a much shorter period, 2007–08.

== See also ==
- Water Rights in Israel-Palestine
- Water supply and sanitation in the Palestinian territories
