= Israel–Palestine relations =

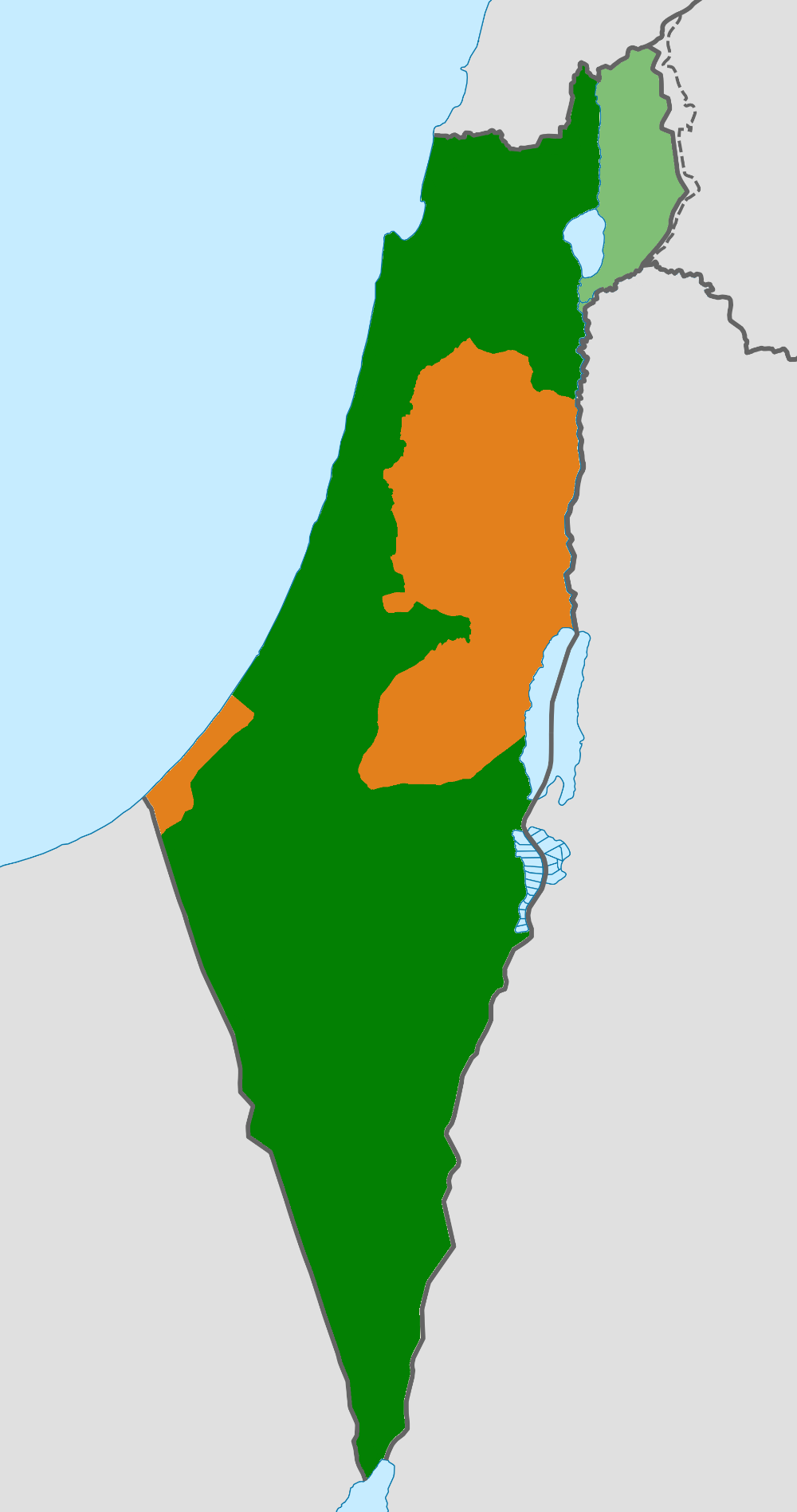

- Israel: Palestine

Israel–Palestine relations refers to the political, security, economical and other relations between the State of Israel and the State of Palestine (as well as with the preceding Palestinian National Authority and earlier Palestine Liberation Organization). Israel and the PLO began to engage in the late 1980s and early 1990s in what became the Israeli–Palestinian peace process, culminated with the Oslo Accords in 1993 where Palestine became the second Arab country to recognise Israel. Shortly after, the Palestinian National Authority was established and during the next 6 years formed a network of economic and security connections with Israel, being referred to as a fully autonomous region with self-administration. In the year 2000, the relations severely deteriorated with the eruption of the Al-Aqsa Intifada – a rapid escalation of the Israeli–Palestinian conflict. The events calmed down in 2005, with reconciliation and cease fire. The situation became more complicated with the split of the Palestinian Authority in 2007, the violent split of Fatah and Hamas factions, and Hamas' takeover of the Gaza Strip. The Hamas takeover resulted in a complete rift between Israel and the Palestinian faction in the Gaza Strip, cancelling all relations except limited humanitarian supply.

== Leadership timeline ==
Heads of government of Israel and Palestine from 1950 to present:

== Background ==
=== Economy ===
As of 2015, Israel's GDP per capita is more than $35,000 and the unemployment rate is at 5%. Israel maintains a strong currency and has the best protection of property rights of all the economic systems in the Middle East. Israel is a member of the Organization for Economic Cooperation and Development (OECD), and is also known as the "entrepreneurship country".

As a result of the Israeli–Palestinian conflict, Palestine has not been able to form a completely independent economic system. Foreign direct investment is almost non-existent. In 2019, Israel was ranked 19 on the UN's Human Development Index ranking of 189 countries, while Palestine was ranked 115. In addition to agriculture, Palestine's main economic income is aid from the international community and Palestinian labor in Israel or other places.

Joint economic cooperation between Israelis and Palestinians officials has experienced growth over the past years. Starting in 2008, Cisco Systems began a concerted effort to jump-start the nascent Palestinian IT sector with a holistic ecosystem approach, encompassing venture capital, private equity, capacity building and direct outsourcing to Palestinian companies. The company invested $15 million toward that end and drew in other major international investors and donors, including Microsoft, HP and Google. The Palestinian IT sector has since grown from 0.8% of GDP in 2008 to 5% in 2010.

Olives of Peace is a joint Israeli–Palestinian business venture to sell olive oil. Through this project, Israelis and Palestinians have carried out joint training sessions and planning. The oil is sold under the brand name "Olives of Peace."

In October 2009, a new government-funded project launched promoting tourism and travel between the two areas. New business efforts and tourist attractions have been initiated in Jenin. The two regions are planning a joint industrial zone which would bridge the border. Palestinians would produce locally made handicrafts and sell them through Gilboa to other regions of the world. Another possible project is a joint language center, where Israelis and Palestinians would teach each other Arabic and Hebrew, as well as aspects of their cultural heritage.

Since 2010, Israeli high-tech companies have employed Palestinian engineers. To date, the majority of them are outsourced workers, but Mellanox, a computer hardware firm, plans to hire 15–20 Palestinian engineers as regular employees.

In 2011, bilateral trade between Israel and the Palestinian-ruled areas reached $4.3 billion, with Israeli exports to the PA amounting to $3.5 billion and Palestinian exports to Israel amounting to $816 million. According to Nader Tamimi, chair of the Association of Traditional Industries in the PA, there are regular interactions between Palestinian and Israeli businessmen.

At a conference hosted by the Faculty of Business and Management at Ben-Gurion University of the Negev in 2012, Israeli and Palestinian trade experts met to discuss ways of promoting cross-border business interactions.

=== Politics ===
The political relationship is rooted in conflict between Israel and Palestine. The conflict is over whether or not Palestinians should be able to form its own separate country in government within a part of the land that is currently controlled by Israel. Palestine, in the years before 1948, was a piece of land surrounded by the Jordan River, Egypt, the Mediterranean Sea, Syria and Lebanon. The battle over this specific area of land has arisen due to contrasting views on who has a valid claim to the land. According to Jews, the Hebrew Bible states that Palestine has been promised to them by God. Modern day Palestine was ancient Israel. Thus, Jews have an ancient claim to the land. However, Palestinian Arabs are unwilling and unable to acknowledge their claim of Israel. Palestinians believe that because they were in most recent control of the land, it should stay in their possession. The continual conflict between Israel and Palestine regarding their inability to acknowledge the other's claims to territory has resulted in many years of violence and instability in the region.

The area of land that has caused political conflict between Israel and Palestinian also affects international relations. Israel/Palestine is strategically located at the crossroads of Asia, Europe and Africa. This has caused the United States and other nations to come together in the hopes of finding a solution to the conflict. However, a solution to the conflict is currently still evasive.

Israel and the United States perceive the military actions of Hamas as terrorist aggression, and cite Israeli national defense as the rationale for Israel's aggressive military response. On the other hand, Palestinians view the actions of the Israeli military as state-sponsored terrorism. Both sides continue to suffer casualties as the impasse over territorial rights in the region continues. This conflict spills over into the regional and international communities, with both sides drawing support and military aide.

== Current status ==
=== Economic relations ===
Israel desires a strong economic system for Palestine. The Israeli government has created and distributed areas to expand Palestine's trade system, which includes import/export passages, information, specific economic sectors and transportation. Israel also encourages Palestinian investment in Israel. The Israeli government has promised to provide risk insurance and long term visiting permits to the Palestinian investors.

As of 2015, Israel and Palestinian administration in the West Bank continue in partial economic relations, including limited bilateral trade, transfer of goods from and to Palestine via Israel (in which Israel collects the imports taxes and transfers to Palestinians), limited electricity and water sales from Israel to Palestinians and admission of Palestinian workers from the West Bank to work in Israel on daily basis.

In 2013, commercial trade between Israel and the Palestinian Authority were valued at US$20 billion annually. The continuously increasing transactions led to the creation of the joint Palestinian and Israeli initiative, the Jerusalem Arbitration Center (JAC). The center will specialize as an independent institution focusing on business arbitration between Israelis and Palestinians.

Before the most recent conflict, many Palestinians were unemployed, resulting in a struggling Palestinian economy. As of 2014, this has only worsened, with 1 out 6 Palestinians left jobless. The World Bank Country Director for West Bank and Gaza Steen Lau Jorgensen has stated, "Without immediate action by the Palestinian Authority, donors and the Government of Israel to re-vitalize the economy and improve the business climate, a return to violence as we have seen in recent years will remain a clear and present danger."

In January 2015, Israel withheld tax transfers to the Palestinians in response to the Palestinian membership application to the International Criminal Court. Activists in Abbas' Fatah movement countered it by enforcing a boycott of goods made by Israeli food companies.

=== Security coordination ===
Palestinian security forces in the West Bank have retained limited security relations with the Israeli counterparts in the IDF and Shin Bet since re-establishment of relations in 2005. The parties cooperate on prevention of Hamas and Islamic Jihad activity in the West Bank, which is considered a threat by both parties.

In March 2015, the PLO Central Council adopted a resolution calling the Palestinian President to cease cooperation of Palestinian security forces with Israel in light of severing economic and political relations.

In October 2015, tensions rose, resulting in thirty-two Palestinians and seven Israelis being killed in two weeks. The unrest was a result of Palestinians’ resentment over heightened Israeli intrusion on the al-Aqsa mosque compound in Jerusalem. A UN spokesman denounced Israel's actions on the matter, and stated that UN Secretary-General Ban Ki-moon "would find that the apparent excessive use of force by Israeli security forces is also troubling and demands serious review, as it only serves to exacerbate the situation, leading to a vicious cycle of needless bloodshed."

=== Water resources ===
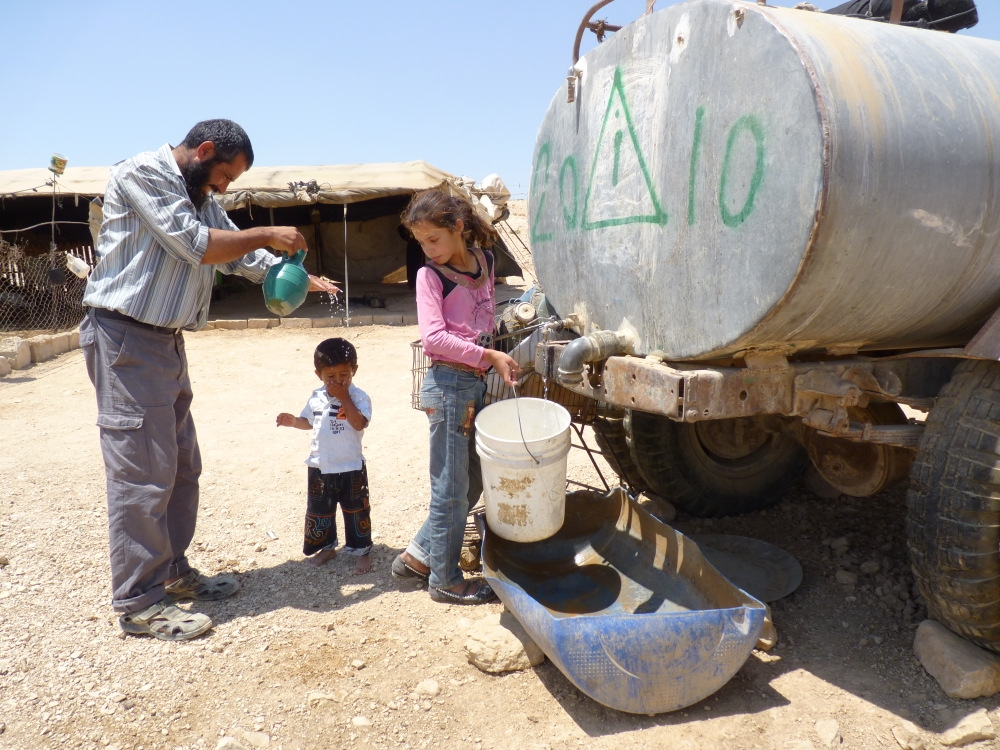
Palestinian villagers purchase water from water trucks in Khirbet A-Duqaiqah in the Hebron Hills

The history of international water relations in the Middle East dates back to 2500 BCE, when two Sumerian city-states solved a dispute over water along the Tigris River. Since then, negotiations have come a long way. In the last century, the focus of treaty-making over water has shifted towards the use, development and conservation of resources.

The Mountain Aquifer constitutes one of Israeli and Palestinian chief water sources. The Mountain Aquifer begins in the North of Israel and flows from the West Bank to the Mediterranean. The aquifer is composed of three groundwater basins: the western basin, the eastern basin and the northern basin. The replenishment zones for these aquifers are majoritarily located east of the green line; most of the aquifers themselves as well as the storage zones are located in Israeli territory. The western basin, also known as the Yarkon-Taninim, is the most valuable to Israel as it has the highest storage capacity, the largest installed pumping rate, and constitutes the most of Israel's total water production from the three basins.

The Jordan River is the second of Israeli and Palestinian chief water sources. The waters of this river also serve as a main water source for the surrounding Arab nations of Syria and Jordan. In 1953, in response to Arab construction of the Yarmouk dam, Israel began to construct its National Water Carrier as a means to divert the waters of the Jordan River to irrigate the coastal Sharon Plain and eventually the Negev Desert. The Arab Nations interpreted this as a threat to their stakes in the usage of the water and responded with their own plan to divert water from the Jordan River to the Yarmouk river. Israel eventually backed off and moved its diversion plan elsewhere. Today each of the nations continue to draw water from the Jordan River basin.

The National Water Carrier was completed by Mekorot in 1964. It consists of around 134 km of large pipes, tunnels, and reservoirs and around 34 km of open canals. The water carrier channels an average of 380 MCM of water a year from the Kinneret. Water from the Jordan River flows into the Kinneret, which is how Israel uses the water carrier to divert 75% of the water from the Jordan River to Israel. The amount of fresh water that flows in the Jordan River as well as the Dead Sea has significantly declined as a result of this diversion. The Red Sea–Dead Sea Canal has been proposed as a way to remedy the shrinking, though right now it is only a proposal.

After the 1967 War, Israel seized the West Bank from Jordan and began to regulate water usage in the area. It set pumping quotas and made it so that wells could not be dug without a permit. Since 1967, permits have been granted for only 23 new wells. Since then, efforts have been made toward fulfilling the rights of Palestinians to self-determination. One such effort is called the Oslo Process, which began in 1993. A segment of this deals with water rights. The Oslo II agreement, also known as the Interim Agreement, was established in 1995. Under Oslo II, a Palestinian Water Authority was set up to manage and allocate the water supply allotted to Palestine by Israel. Oslo II also included estimations of future Palestinian water usage in an effort to come to a concrete agreement for future allocations. It created a Joint Water Committee so the needs of both sides would be represented. The committee outlined guidelines for the protection of both Israeli and Palestinian water supplies from contamination and pollution. The treaty was not meant to set permanent precedent; rather it was made as an interim period so that by its end, more concrete measures could be taken. The interim period ended in May 1999. And yet, many of the policies in place today are the same as what was outlined in the Oslo II Accords which was meant to be temporary.

==== Current water use ====
In 2006, fresh water consumption in Israel was equivalent to 170 cubic meters per capita per year. In the same year, Palestinian water consumption in the West Bank was measured at 100 cubic meters per capita per year. The averages in both areas as well as in surrounding Arab countries have steadily declined since 1967 due to the effects of climate change.

1.2 million Gazans have limited or no access to water. Israeli policy does not deal directly with Gaza in terms of water allocation and distribution. This is because the Gaza Aquifer, supplemented by water desalination processes, is alleged to be able to satisfy the water needs of the area.

In 2010, Hamas, the current governing authority in Gaza, embarked on an infrastructure development program in order to make Gaza more self-sufficient in terms of water supply. The plan was not completed. Israel imposed on the plan because of suspicions that the tunnels and other infrastructure were going to be used for terrorist purposes. Despite the presence of the Gaza Aquifer, 90% of potentially potable water in Gaza is currently undrinkable. Overpumping is a large cause of this, as Gazans do not have the correct tools and infrastructure to utilize their water source.

Israel does supply water, however, to the West Bank. Israel sells water to the West Bank at a rate of 53 MCM (million cubic meters) of water per year. Palestinians in the West Bank purchase about one third of their total water supply from Mekorot, Israel's national water agency. As is also true for Israel, most water is consumed in the Agricultural sector of the West Bank. Only about 5% of the West Bank is agricultural land. Under the Oslo II Accord, 80% of water from the above named sources goes to Israel, and 20% to the Palestinians living in the West Bank.

Some argue that one reason Israel is so strict and careful with its water policy is because of how vulnerable the water supply naturally is. According to an Israeli Water Commission memorandum, "incorrect application of drilling on the West Bank could salinize the water reservoirs of the State of Israel."

Over 80 percent of the water infrastructure in the Gaza Strip has sustained damage as a result of the Gaza war. Israel reconnected several main water pipes in northern Gaza to the Israeli water company Mekorot after previously cutting off the water supply during the conflict; however, residents reported that water was still not flowing. Local officials suspect that the pipes and the water distribution network in Gaza were compromised during the war. Additionally, wells that previously met some of the water demands before the war have also been damaged, with some contaminated by sewage and left untreated due to the ongoing conflict. Many wells in Gaza are simply unreachable as they are situated in war zones, in close proximity to Israeli military installations, or within forced evacuation areas. In May 2025, the UN Office for the Coordination of Humanitarian Affairs announced that fuel restrictions in Gaza were hindering water and sanitation services, as well as water purification operations.

==== International law ====
Since 1955, Jordan and Israel have held regular talks over the sharing of the Jordan River. International law considers states and institutions created by states as the only legitimate actors, which explains why Palestinians have not been as much a part of the conversation as some might argue they should be. The ambiguity of international law tends to unintentionally favor Israel in this way: it is an established state while Palestinians are not yet united as a sovereign, internationally recognized entity. Experts have argued that water laws ought to be more concrete though this seems difficult because of the variation in each geographic space and each political situation. There is no formula for exactly how to divide up the waters. Some guidelines do exist, however, as a frame of reference . Many rules of law pertaining to shared water resources follow the precedent of The Helsinki Rules, an international guideline on the regulation of transnational rivers and their groundwaters. These rules rely on five principles: "reasonable and equitable utilization, avoidance of significant harm to other users or states, advance notification, consultation and negotiation, exchange of information, peaceful settlements of disputes." These principles are largely seen as soft or customary law. After the Helsinki Rules were published, the U.N. began to research the topic of international water law which culminated in the formulation of the 1997 UN Convention on the NonNavigational Uses of International Watercourses. This convention, like the Helsinki Rules, is also largely considered customary law. The aquifers under dispute in Israel-Palestine are transboundary aquifers: in which a political boundary is between the outflow and recharge areas. The international laws can be used toward policy making, though nothing concrete has yet been ratified.

=== Healthcare coordination ===
==== COVID-19 ====
On 11 March, Israel delivered 20 tons of disinfectant to the West Bank.

On 17 March, the Defense Ministry tightened restrictions on Palestinian workers, limiting entry to those working in essential sectors, and requiring that they remain in Israel instead of commuting. Also, Israel and the Palestinian Authority set up a joint operations room to coordinate response to the virus.

On 25 March, the Palestinian Authority urged all Palestinians working in Israel to return to the West Bank. All those returning were requested to self-isolate.

== See also ==
- All Nations Café, cultural hospitality project
- Israel Iran relations
- Israel-Jordan relations
- Israeli support for Hamas
