= Baqa'a refugee camp =

Palestinian refugee camp near Amman, Jordan

Coordinates: 32°04′25″N 35°50′35″E

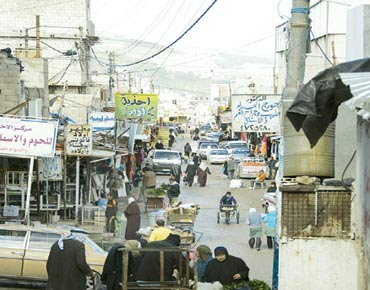
A busy street in Baqa'a

The Baqa'a refugee camp (Arabic: البقعة), first created in 1968, lies in Balqa Governorate, 20 km north of the Jordanian capital Amman, and is home to around 100,000 Palestinian refugees who are registered as such with the United Nations. It is the largest refugee camp in Jordan, followed by the Zaatari refugee camp.

== History ==
The Baqa'a refugee camp was established in 1968 in Jordan to house Palestinians displaced by the Naksa (Arabic for "the setback"), which occurred after the Israeli capture of the West Bank and the Gaza Strip during the Six-Day War.

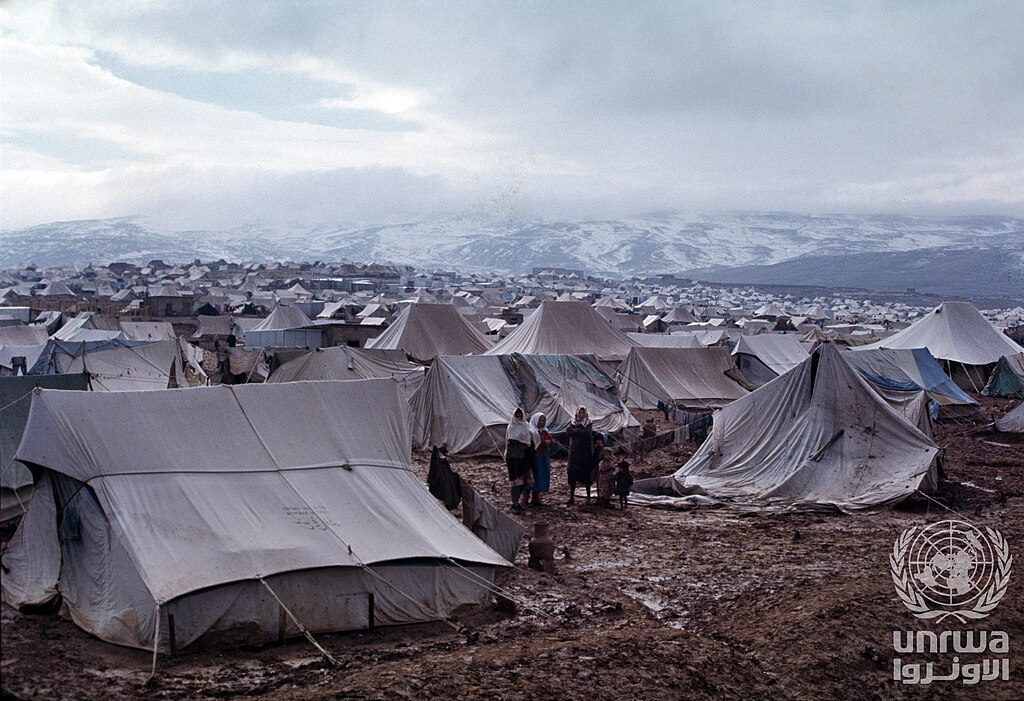
Baqa'a refugee camp in 1967

Between June 1967 and February 1968, residents were housed in temporary camps in the Jordan Valley. When Baqa'a was set up it had 5,000 tents for 26,000 refugees on an area of about 1.4 square kilometres. UNRWA replaced the tents with 8,048 prefabricated shelters between 1969 and 1971 with contributions from West Germany. Most of the residents have since then replaced the original tents and prefabs with concrete shelters.

== Facilities ==
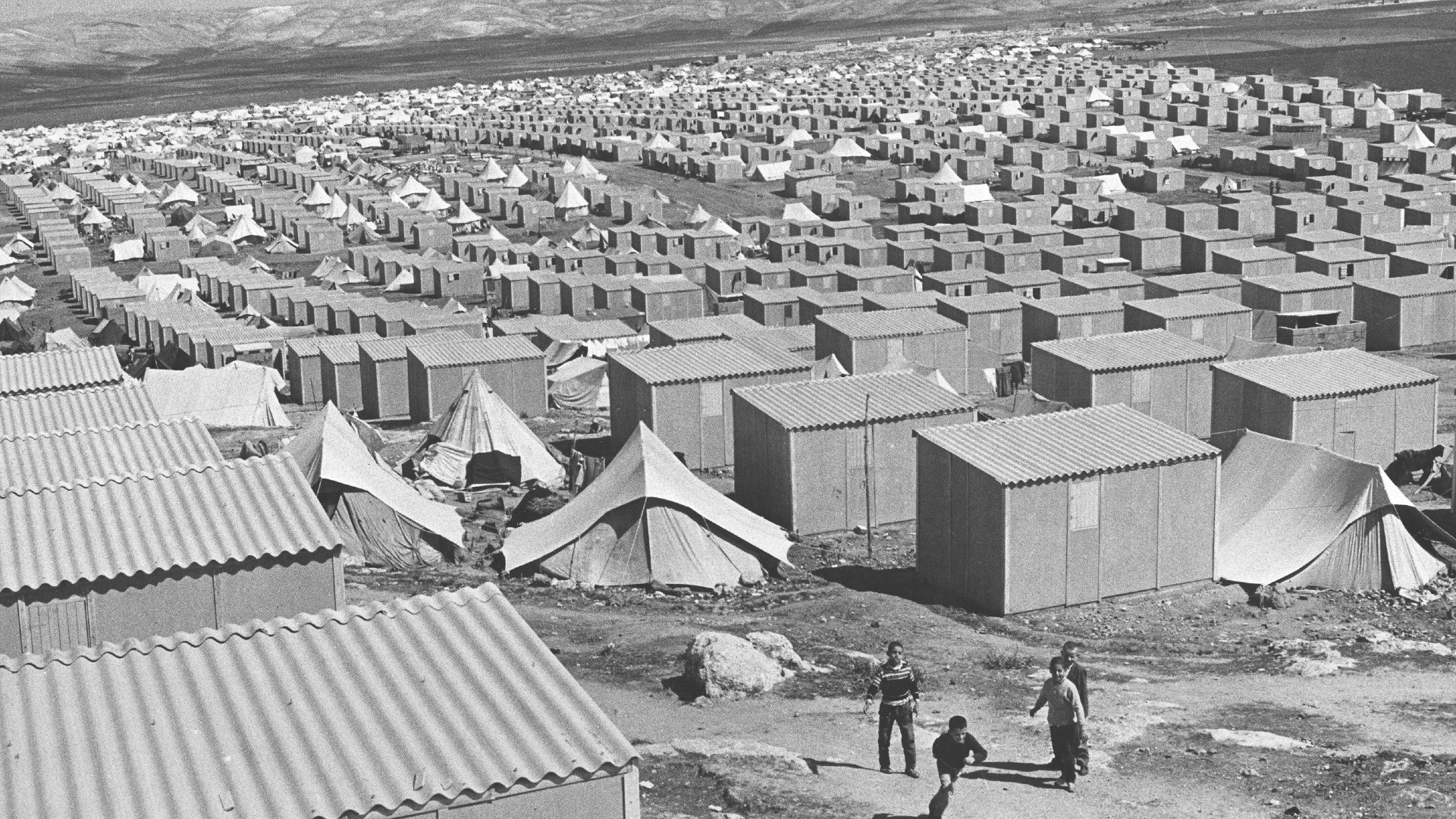
A view of the camp in 1969 showing tents alongside buildings constructed by UNRWA

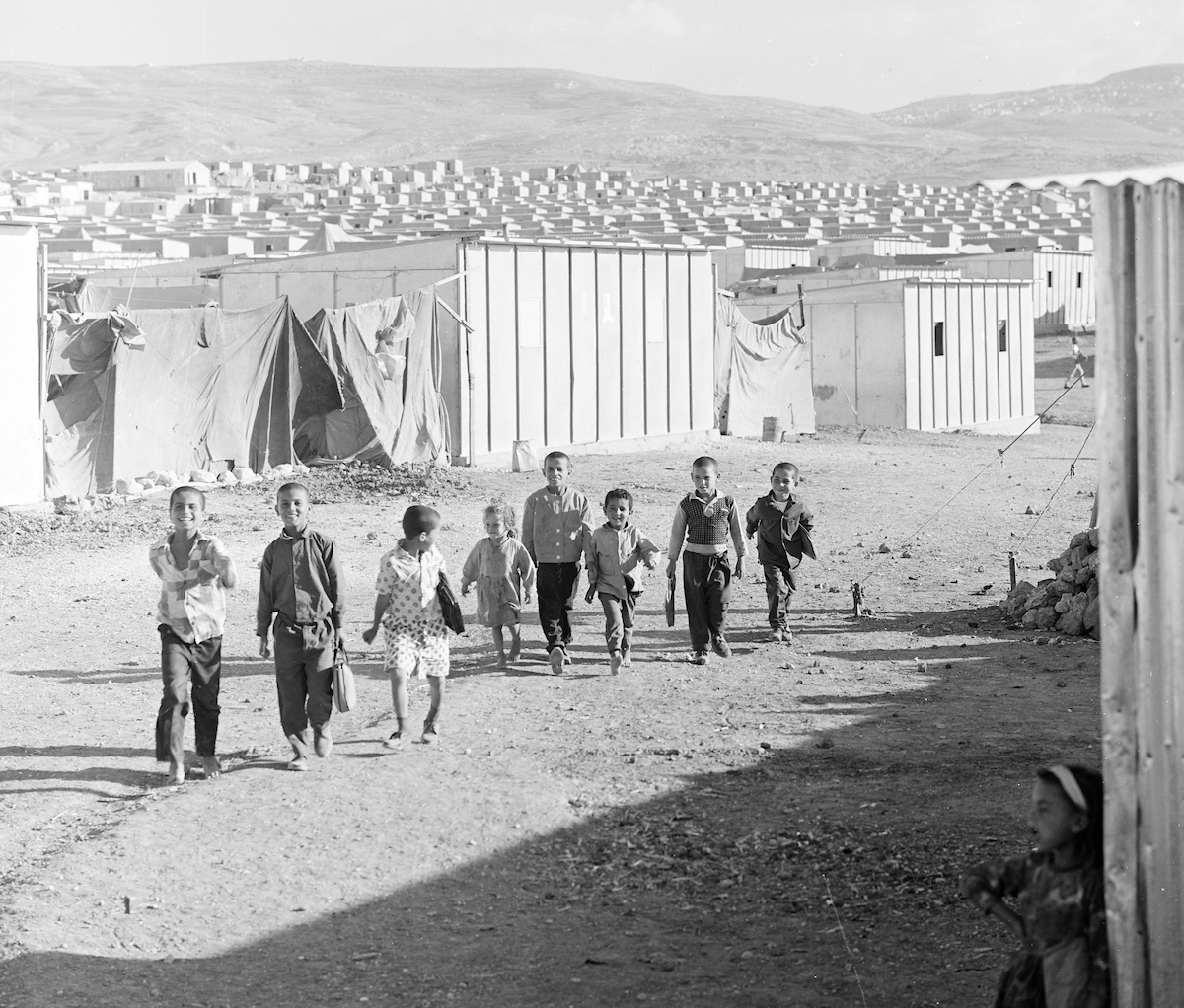
Children in the camp, 1969

During the 2003–04 school term, the 16 schools in the camp enrolled 16,718 students, and had 493 paid employees on the teaching staff, with each school run on a double-shift basis in eight school buildings. The UN also runs a general clinic, and two mother-and-child clinics, which jointly treat around 1,200 patients every day, and which are staffed by 12 doctors, two dentists, and 57 nurses and assistants; there is also a kindergarten and nursery financed by UNRWA. Two women's programs run courses in sewing, hairdressing, computers, Internet, exercise, English, legal consultancy, and handicrafts. There are also two sports clubs and 17 charities operating in the camp.

The camp houses a market, called Souq Al-Hal-lal, where residents can earn some money selling their wares or food, and many also earn a living by traveling by bus in the morning to Amman, where they work as cleaning or maintenance staff.

== See also ==
- Jordan–Palestine relations
- Palestinian refugee camps
