= Battle of Amman (1970) =

Black September event in Jordan

- Part of Black September
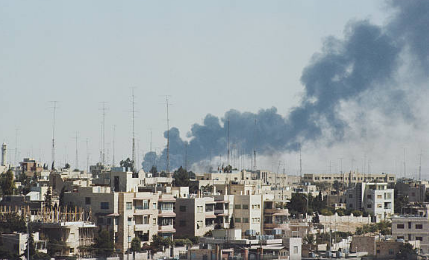
Date	16–27 September 1970
Location	Amman, Jordan
Result	Ceasefire brokered by Arab governments: Signing of a 14-point agreement

Belligerents
Jordan	PLO: Fatah; Popular Front for the Liberation of Palestine (PFLP); Democratic Front for the Liberation of Palestine (DFLP)

Commanders and leaders
(Jordan) Hussein bin Talal (Jordan) Habis Majali	Yasser Arafat

Units involved
Royal Army	PLO: Fatah; Popular Front for the Liberation of Palestine (PFLP); Democratic Front for the Liberation of Palestine (DFLP)

Casualties and losses
- 5,000 to 10,000 as of 22 September; Several hundred fedayeen commandos captured by Jordanian forces

The Battle of Amman (Arabic: معركة عمّان) took place in September 1970 between forces of the Palestine Liberation Organization (the Fedayeen) and the Jordanian Army. Hussein's government considered that the casus belli of the battle was the hijacking of planes carried out by the Popular Front on 6 September. On 17 September, the army launched a big attack against a Palestinian commandos bases in Amman.

The United States was in favor of Israeli intervention to aid Hussein, but this proved unnecessary. The violence was brought to an end after the parties agreed to a ceasefire agreement signed in Cairo, Egypt.

== Etymology ==
The PLO also referred to it as the September massacre.

== Background ==
After the crushing defeat by Israel in the 1967 Six-Day War, the Jordanian government reaffirmed the unity of the two banks of the Jordan River i.e. between the Jordanians and Palestinians, a bond that will never be "broken" under King Hussein's rule, according to the prime minister. Within a matter of months, the Jordanian border had become a pivotal base for the guerrillas to launch attacks against the Israeli army.

Disputes escalated between the PLO and King Hussein beginning in 1968. By 1970, the Palestinian commando forces had expanded to the point where they maintained parallel educational, military, and social institutions in Jordan. The king feared the growing power of the Palestinians, which might lead to his eventual overthrow. The Palestinian fedayeen openly began to demand the overthrow of Hussein. Only weeks before the start of major hostilities, the Palestinian National Council agreed to organize a revolutionary process that would lead to the establishment of "nationalist rule" in Jordan. The royal army was made up mostly of East Jordanian Bedouins who were staunchly loyal to Hussein's regime.

== Events ==
On 6 September 1970, two foreign planes (TWA Flight 741 and Swissair Flight 100) were hijacked by the Popular Front for the Liberation of Palestine and transported to Dawson Field near Zarqa. The hijackers threatened to blow themselves up and the planes if any attempt was made to storm the planes. The Popular Front gave the Swiss government 72 hours to release three Palestinian commandos serving 12-year sentences for attacking an Israeli airline in Zürich in 1969. It was estimated that there were 90 Americans and 50 Israelis among the passengers on the Swiss plane.

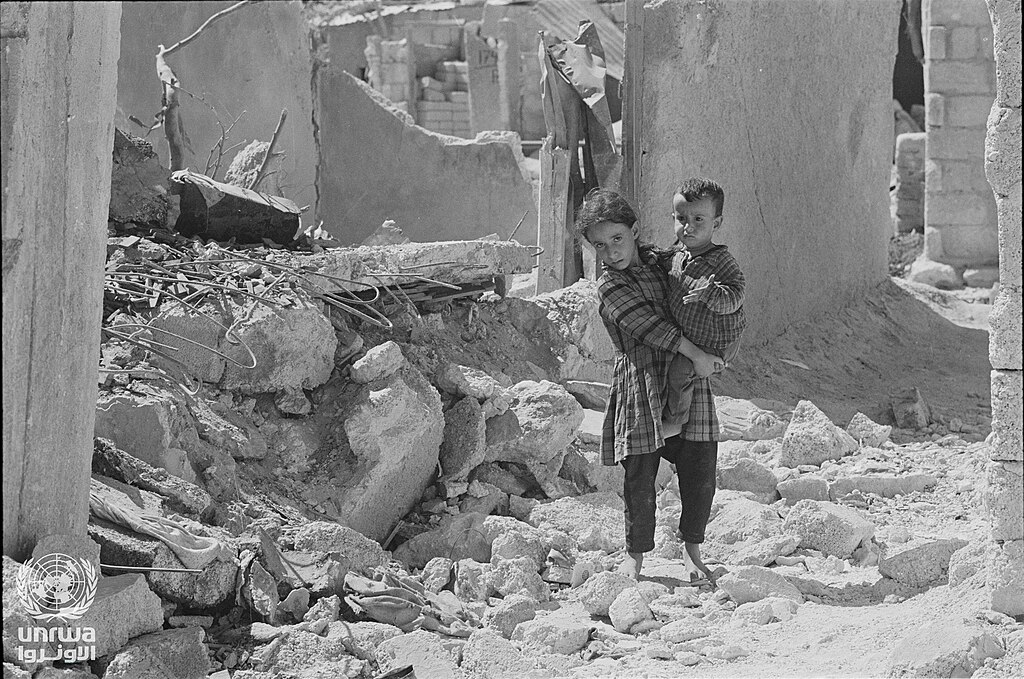
Refugees in the ruins of Amman

The Nixon administration considered intervening, with the Joint Chiefs of Staff (JCS) requesting permission to put the USS Independence within 100 nautical miles from the Lebanon/Israel coast. America was evaluating the possibility of Israel's intervention and the damage that might be caused to King Hussein as a result. The UK proposed convening the UN Security Council to discuss the aircraft hijacking crisis. Meanwhile, US military forces were preparing planes for evacuations. Six C-130 aircraft were transferred to Incirlik Air Base in Turkey. On 9 September, a third airliner, a British one, was hijacked and taken to Jordan. The Soviet Union called on all powers to avoid intervention. The proposed agreement stipulated the prohibition of all military activity in the capital and attacks by any party against the other or against civilians and property.

On the morning of 16 September, the royal army attacked Fedayeen strongholds in Amman. Simultaneously, the main airport and the country's borders were closed. There were conflicting reports, as the Palestinians claimed that the entire capital was under their control. Amman Radio claimed that by 16 September the capital, Amman, was in government hands, except for small pockets. Palestinian groups hoped for Arab support, especially from Syria and Iraq, but this did not occur.

Hussein proclaimed martial law on 17 September and carried out a cabinet reshuffle. Meanwhile, royal forces attacked the headquarters of Fatah Command on Mount Hussein in Amman. The New York Times reported heavy fighting at dawn on 17 September, quoting the Fedayeen as saying it would be the "final" confrontation. Mortar shells fell "70 yards" from the US Embassy.

As of 19 September, the battle in the city was described as being fought from house to house. However, even with superior firepower, it was difficult to eliminate the Fedayeen snipers.

Amman was placed under a complete curfew, and the army warned that anyone caught outside would be shot. The Intercontinental Hotel in Amman, where the reporters were based, was a target for both warring sides. The British embassy also came under shell fire.

Amman is burning for the sixth day, and thousands of our people are under the rubble, their bodies rotting. Tens of thousands of homes have been demolished. Hundreds of thousands of our people are in the streets and mosques, homeless and homeless. Our dead are in the squares, their bodies scattered. Hunger and thirst are killing the rest of our children, women, and the elderly, and their cannons and tanks are still bombing and destroying. Despite all their promises to you, this is a massacre that history has never witnessed.

— Yasser Arafat

By 22 September, the Red Cross estimated the number of casualties at between 5,000 and 10,000.

On 24 September, Hussein met with the U.S. ambassador.

China expressed its support for the PLO and vehemently denounced the mistreatment of the Palestinians by the Jordanian monarchy and government, suggesting that its military assistance to Fatah had reached its pinnacle. Kuwait suspended its economic aid to Jordan. Libya also suspended its aid and cut diplomatic ties. The Algerian Foreign Minister Abdelaziz Bouteflika condemned the government's offensive against the PLO.

The battle ended with the guerrillas being expelled from the capital and its surroundings.

== Aftermath ==
In the wake of the battle, the Palestinian fedayeen were severely weakened. After the defeat in Amman, the focus of the PLO was on gaining international recognition and achieving a two-state solution. George Habash, the leader of the Popular Front, believed that the Palestinian militants should have regarded the Hashemite regime as a colonial establishment with aims comparable to those of Israel.

Abu Iyad, a member of Fatah, contended that the Jordanian government effectively manipulated the populace's apprehension towards the fedayeen, categorizing them as "non-believers, infidels, and lawbreakers". In retrospect, he held the belief "that it was essential for the Palestinian resistance to unequivocally demonstrate that their adversary was not the general population, but rather the ruling family, a few select individuals, and the governing body overseeing the nation". For prominent Palestinian scholars, the conflict between the PLO and Hussein's government reinforced the perception that the Hashemite regime was "illegitimate, Western-imposed, and a crypto-Zionist construct." During the spring of 1971, despite their weakened military situation, the Palestinians escalated their political aspirations by issuing a fresh appeal to topple Hussein's government, while also contemplating the prospect of forming a government-in-exile.

== See also ==
- Jordan–Palestine relations
