= Mekorot =

National water company of Israel

- Type: State-owned corporation
- Industry: Water industry
- Founded: 1937; 89 years ago Mandatory Palestine
- Headquarters: Tel Aviv, Israel
- Services: Desalination, water supply, water management, water control
- Website: www.mekorot.co.il

Mekorot (Hebrew: מקורות, lit. "Sources") is the national water company of Israel and the country's top agency for water management. Founded in 1937, it supplies Israel with approximately 80% of its drinking water and operates a cross-country water supply network known as the National Water Carrier of Israel. Mekorot and its subsidiaries have partnered with numerous countries around the world in areas including desalination and water management.

== History ==
Mekorot was established as the "Ḥevrat ha-Mayim" ('Water Company') on 15 February 1937 by Levi Shkolnik (later Eshkol, Prime Minister of Israel between 1963 and 1969), water engineer Simcha Blass, and Pinchas Koslovsky (later Sapir, Minister of Finance between 1963 and 1968).

== Water supply system ==
Mekorot supplies approx. 80% of Israel's drinking water and approx. 65% of its water supplies. Mekorot supplies over 1.7 billion cubic meters of water to homes, agricultural fields, & industrial plants throughout Israel. The company provides water & services to the private & public sectors in Israel & to the Palestinian Authority & the Kingdom of Jordan, through political agreements. The company operates about 13,000 km of pipelines, 3,000 production & supply facilities, 1,200 drillings, 1,000 water reservoirs & pools and 20 desalination facilities. The company has accumulated investments of NIS 1.5-2 billion per year, & a three-year development plan.

Mekorot's water supply system unifies most of the regional water plants, the National Water Carrier and Yarkon-Negev plant, and draws water from the Sea of Galilee, aquifers, boreholes, seawater, desalinated water, and brackish water.

== WaTech Center ==
In 2004, the company established WaTech technological entrepreneurship center For technological entrepreneurship and collaborations between Mekorot and start-up companies, entrepreneurs, academia and investors in the field of water technologies in Israel and around the world, with the aim of promoting and developing water technologies in Mekorot and in the State of Israel, to increase the group's export capacity, and to assist the company in managing the water system in a more efficient, cost-effective and sustainable manner.

As of 2024, Mekorot has contracted with nearly 10 startups and operates R&D centers in the water field.

Within the framework of the activities of WaTech, projects were carried out with start-up companies or mature companies that develop innovative and original technologies and Mekorot serves as an alpha, beta or demonstration site for these technologies.

== National Water Carrier ==
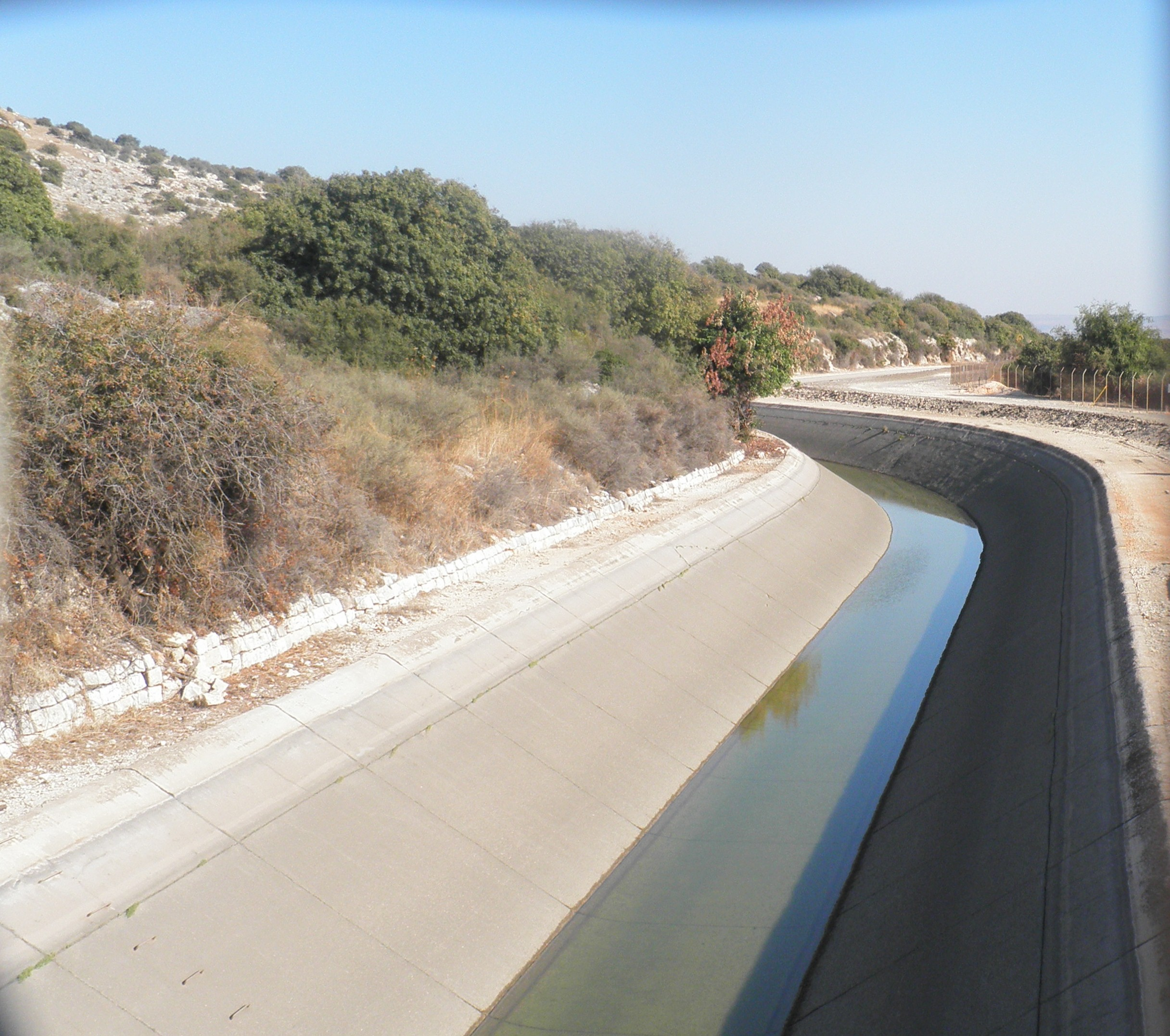
Segment of the National Water Carrier near Kibbutz Hukok

Mekorot's National Water Carrier, known in Hebrew as המוביל הארצי Hamovil ha'artzi, runs from Lake Kinneret (also known as The Sea of Galilee) in the north to the northern Negev Desert in the south. The system has been expanded to pipe water from desalination plants on the Mediterranean coast.

Groundbreaking national project for transferring water throughout Israel, in all directions and collecting water from desalination facilities that were established along the coastal strip in the west of the country, to cope with the increased demand for water in the country.

== 2004–2015 – The New National Carrier ==
Groundbreaking national project for transferring water throughout the country, in all directions and collecting water from desalination facilities that were established along the coastal strip in the west of the country, to cope with the increased demand for water in the country.

2007 – Launching of the National Filtration Plant As part of its commitment to water quality, Mekorot builds the main filtration plant at the Eshkol site in the Beit Natofa Valley to improve the water of the Sea of Galilee before its flows into the National Carrier pipeline system.

2022 – Inauguration of the fifth water supply system to Jerusalem Inaugurated with the aim of expanding the scope of water supply to Jerusalem and the surrounding towns, including meeting future water needs in the region.

2023 – Launching of the National Carrier Flow Reversal Project Delivery of surplus desalinated water to their destinations: strengthening the Sea of Galilee, increasing water supply to northern towns and continued compliance with Israel's obligations to Jordan in the east.

== Water Tariffs ==
Water tariffs are set by the Water Authority. Tariffs are updated every six months according to changes in the Consumer Price Index, electricity rates and the average wage index. The rates vary according to use: domestic, consumption and services, industry and agriculture. Rates for industrial and agricultural use are lower than those for domestic consumption and services. The bulk water tariff is the same throughout the country, regardless of the difference in supply costs.

== Water Treatment ==
In 2008, Mekorot established a central water filtering plant for water pumped from Lake Kinneret (The Sea Of Galilee). The company also improved quality control. As a result, water quality has improved and less chlorine is added to the water as a disinfecting agent. During the years Mekorot established at the site the National Laboratory, which can assist and monitor water quality.

Mekorot's operations achieved maximum utilization of the mix of water resources through various means. In the field of Desalination Mekorot supplies desalinated seawater, and operates 23 desalination facilities, including in the desert, which produce more than one million cubic meters of desalinated water a day.

In the field of water recycling, the company operates nine waste treatment and water reuse facilities, which provide 85% of the water for Israel's agriculture. In addition, the company operates more than 1,000 wells nationwide, some of which reach the depth of up to 1.5 km, to produce water from aquifers and treat it for drinking and agriculture. In other areas of Israel, Mekorot developed innovative technologies for capturing floodwater in different geographical regions.

== Integrated Water Solutions ==
The company provides an integrated range of water solutions, drawing on its expertise in several areas, including advanced models for water management and operations, the optimal combination of different water sources, seawater desalination, wastewater treatment and recycling for agricultural use, improving water quality, and water source security.

== Innovation & Digitization ==
Mekorot uses advanced technologies such as IT and OT to implement a comprehensive digital transformation of processes, in favor of efficient, paperless, & secure flow of professional-business information. It protects against cyber & other attacks on critical infrastructures, like information infrastructure. Moreover, the company continues to implement innovative water technologies, i.e. the deployment of a fiberoptic network in its water piping, while carrying high speed communications throughout Israel.

== International Activities ==
The "Abraham Agreements" signing opened a new business horizon for the company – in March 2021, Mekorot became the first government company in the infrastructure field operating in the Persian Gulf, signing a development contract with the Kingdom of Bahrain. In September 2021 the company completed the doubling of the water supply to the Kingdom of Jordan, & in April 2022 signed an agreement for the development of the water economy in Azerbaijan. Since then, the company signed agreements and memorandum of understandings in several countries, including France, Singapore, Morocco, Argentina, Chile and Italy.

== Water crisis in the Occupied Palestinian Territories ==
Human rights organisations and international bodies frequently describe the Mekorot's role as a tool of water apartheid. In the Gaza War, Mekorot lines that provide nearly 70% of Gaza's drinking water have been periodically shut down, exacerbating a dire humanitarian crisis for approximately 1.2 million residents.

In 1982, the West Bank water infrastructure controlled by the Israeli army was handed over to Mekorot. As of 2009, Mekorot operates some 42 wells in the West Bank, mainly in the Jordan Valley region, which mostly supply the Israeli settlements. The amount of water Mekorot can sell to the Palestinians is subject to approval of the Israeli authorities. Most of Mekorot's drillings in the West Bank are located in the Jordan Valley, where Palestinians ended up by 2008 drawing 44% less water than what they accessed before the Interim Agreement of 1995. Under those Oslo Accords Israel obtained 80% of the West Bank's waters, with the remaining 20% being Palestinian; a percentage which, however, did not concede the Palestinians any "ownership right". Of their agreed on allocation for 2011 of 138.5 MCM, Palestinians managed to extract only 87 MCM, given the difficulties in obtaining Israeli permits, and the shortfall caused by the drying up of half of Palestinian wells has to be partially offset by buying water from Israel, with the net effect that per capita Palestinian water use has declined 20%.

Mekorot has complete infrastructure control in the West Bank and Gaza, it charges NIS 1.8 per cubic metre of water to Israelis, compared to an average of NIS 2.5 per cubic metre for Palestinians. Over 97.5% of water allocated by Mekorot in areas like the Jordan Valley is designated for settler agricultural use.

== Financial Stability ==
Since 2003, Mekorot has been ranked consistently in the highest financial strength rating (ilAAA) by the international rating company Maalot Standard & Poor's. In 2019, Mekorot was listed at the Tel Aviv Stock Exchange, after raising its first capital in the company's history by issuing tradable bonds, accompanied by the publication of a prospectus. To date, the company has raised over NIS 5 billion while maintaining its high credit rating.

== List of CEO's ==
Mekorot's CEO was Amit Lang, until December 2025. The chairman of the board was Yitzhak Aharonovich (until October 2024)

== See also ==
- Water supply and sanitation in Israel
