= Yarkon-Taninim Aquifer =

Western part of the Israel mountain aquifer

The Yarkon-Taninim Aquifer, also known as the Western Mountain Aquifer of Israel, is the western and larger part of the Mountain Aquifer, which also contains the Eastern and the smaller North-Eastern (Mountain) Aquifers. The Mountain Aquifer and the Coastal Aquifer are the main aquifers shared by Israel in its pre-1967 borders, and Palestine (West Bank and Gaza Strip). It has been the main longterm reservoir of the Israeli water system.

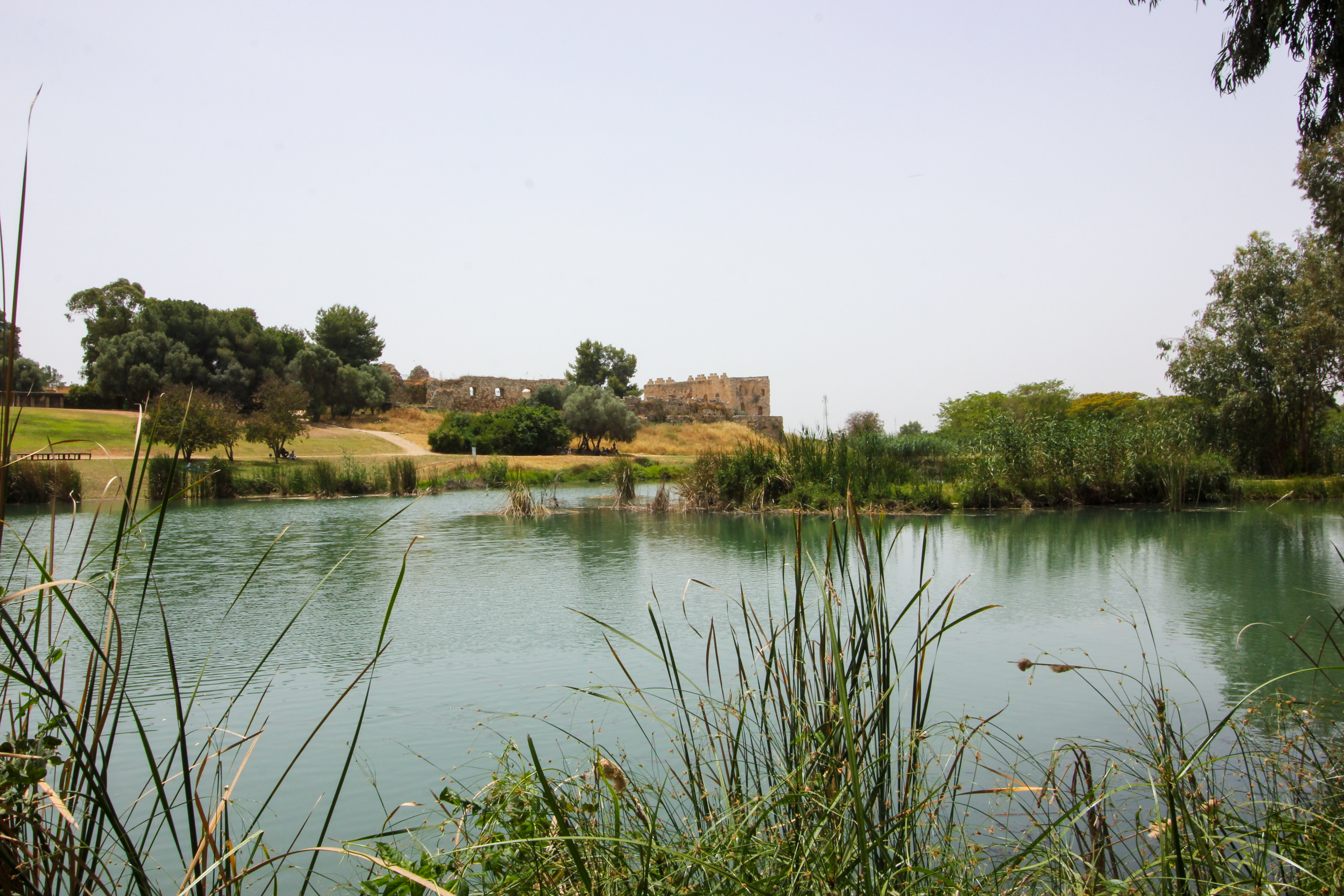
Rosh HaAyin springs, Israel

It is a limestone aquifer, located under the foothills in the centre of the country. It is used by Israel for roughly 340 million cubic meters of water every year and for Palestine at a rate of approximately 20 million cubic meters a year, a rate that remains unchanged from the days when the West Bank was under Jordanian rule. The aquifer goes down to the Mediterranean Sea, beginning in the south and descending towards north-western Israel. The water recharges in the West Bank mountains and ends in the springs of the Yarkon River at Antipatris, and Taninim Springs on the coastal plain of the Mediterranean.

The model adding the Beer Sheva region aquifer to the direct sources of the Yarkon springs was laid down by Samuel Mandel in 1961 and has since been contradicted by work published in 2001.

== Salinisation problem ==
The aquifer faces the problem of a gradual salinisation process, derived from the presence of a saline water body with a salinity level close to that of the Mediterranean and located at the north-western edge of the aquifer. The freshwater and the saltwater are in direct contact, with no rock formations separating them, with just a relatively thin transition zone interposed between the freshwater body from the saltwater body beneath it.

== See also ==
- Water Rights in Israel-Palestine
