= All Nations Café =

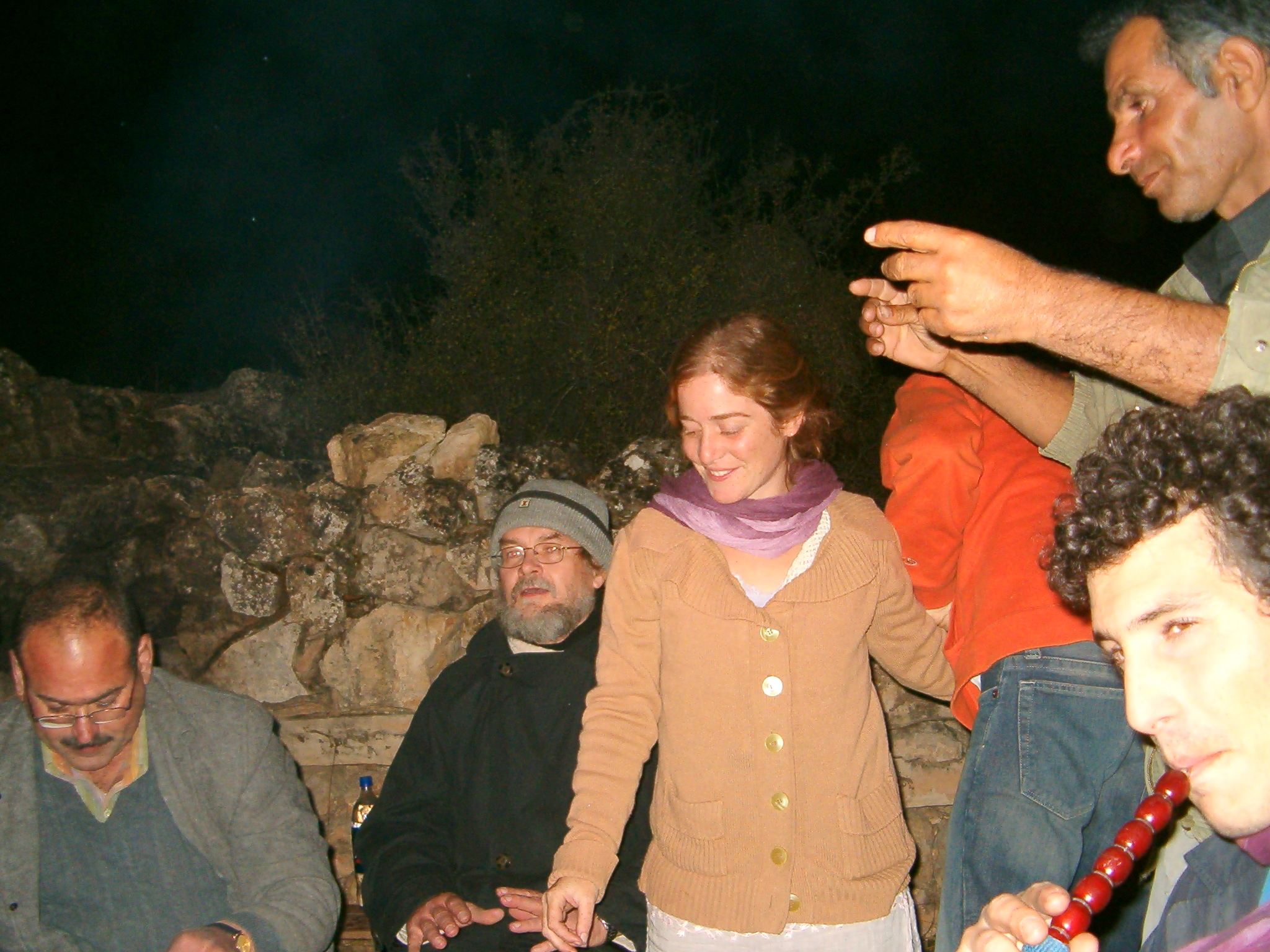
Palestinians and Israelis celebrating at an All Nations Café gathering, Ein Haniya, November 27, 2007

The All Nations Café was a cultural hospitality project founded by a team of Israelis, Palestinians and internationals in East Jerusalem, near the Garden of Gethsemane in 2003, during the Second Intifada.

In 2004 and 2005, the All Nations Café expanded to include musicians and cultural artists, and produced events in other locations, including the Jerash Festival and Amman, Nabi Musa, Switzerland, Germany, England, and the Sinai Peninsula.

In 2006, the All Nations Café launched weekly cultural gatherings of Palestinians and Israelis near Ein Hanya Spring in the historical No man's land area between Jerusalem and Bethlehem. These gatherings expanded to include summer camps, agricultural work with local farmers, and nature cleanup campaigns.

One unique feature of the All Nations Café's work was its lack of political agenda, and its accessibility to people from diverse backgrounds, including poor and rich, fighters and peacemakers, civilians and soldiers, refugees and settlers, women and men, persons with disabilities, people of various faiths, etc.

In 2008, the All Nations Cafe team led a "Holy Land Caravan" through Jerusalem and the West Bank, producing a documentary film with the same title.
