= Jordan–Palestine relations =

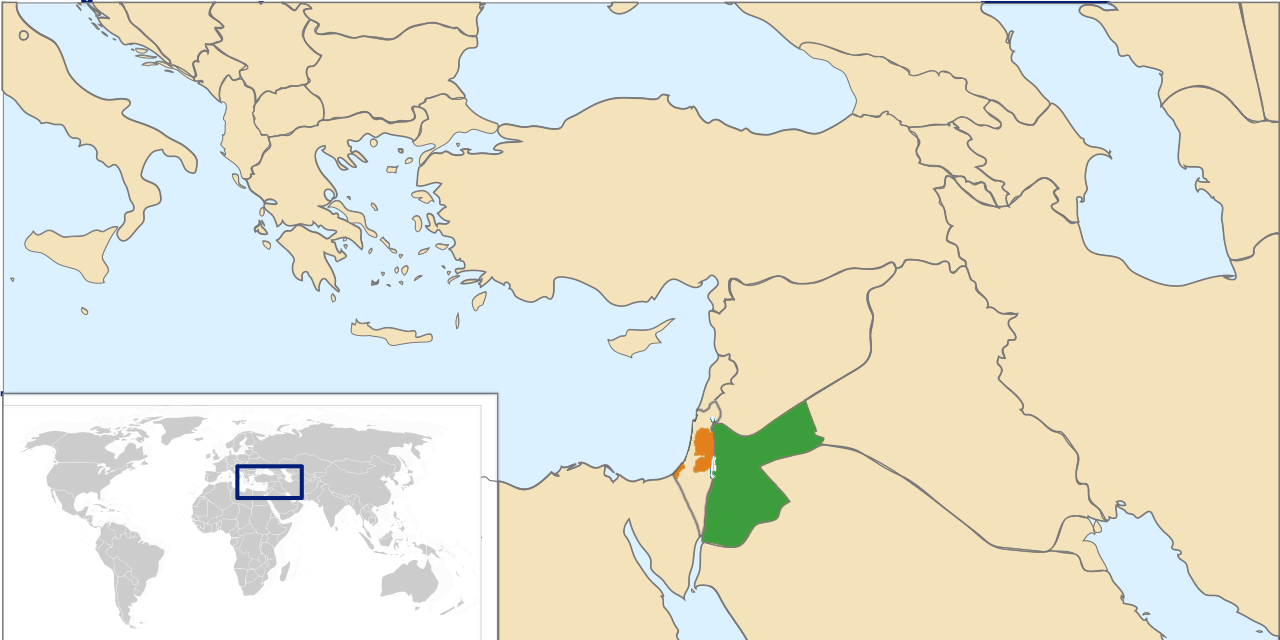

- Jordan: Palestine

Diplomatic mission
- Jordan Liaison Office in Palestine, Ramallah: Embassy of Palestine, Amman

The bilateral relations between Jordan and Palestine have generally been strong as both nations share close cultural and historical ties.

== History ==
=== 1949–1967 ===
Jordan annexed the West Bank on 24 April 1950, after the 1949 armistice agreements. After the annexation, all Palestinians in the West Bank became Jordanian citizens. In the Jordanian parliament, there were 30 seats for both the West and East banks, making roughly equal populations. Palestinians in the West Bank did not face discrimination and were given the same equal rights as the Jordanians of the East Bank.

=== 1967–1988 ===
After the Six-Day War, Jordan lost control of the West Bank to Israel. However, the Palestinians in the West Bank lost neither their citizenship nor their seats in the Jordanian parliament. About 300,000 Palestinians fled to Jordan. In 1970, a conflict broke out between the Jordanian Armed Forces led by King Hussein and the Palestine Liberation Organization led by Yasser Arafat. This conflict was known as Black September. Palestinians had gone on a global skyjacking spree, and there were rumors of some wanting to topple or assassinate the Jordanian King. After the war, Jordan expelled the PLO to Lebanon but kept refugees and integrated Palestinian citizens in Jordan. Palestinians in the West Bank would retain their Jordanian citizenship until Jordan renounced all claims to the West Bank on 31 July 1988. Arafat later recognized the PLO as "the sole legitimate representative of the Palestinian people."

=== 1988–1994 ===
Following the severance of legal ties between the West Bank and the Kingdom of Jordan in 1988, the Jordanian Government supported the PLO struggle to establish a Palestinian state over the West Bank and the Gaza Strip. During the peace conferences that followed the Madrid Peace Conference in 1991, the Palestinians were represented as a sub-delegation within the Jordanian-Palestinian delegation, this resulting from Israeli demands to refrain from representing the Palestinians as an independent nation. During the Israeli-Jordanian talks in Washington D.C. in 1992, most Israeli-Jordanian contentious issues were settled, but the Jordanian government refused to sign any official agreement with Israel as long as no agreement was reached with the Palestinians.

On 13 September 1993 the Oslo Agreement was signed, and the following day the Palestinian members of the Jordanian-Palestinian delegation became a separate delegation. The Oslo accord enabled the Jordanian delegation to openly negotiate with the Israeli delegation, and on 26 October 1994, the Israel-Jordan Peace Treaty was signed.

=== 1994-2022 ===
The Israeli-Jordanian peace treaty created some divisions between Jordan and the Palestinian Authority over the issue of the Islamic holy places in East Jerusalem, over which the treaty recognized Jordanian guardianship, while the Palestinian Authority claimed to have the same rights. On many other issues, the Jordanian government and the Palestinian Authority are in concert, as the government in Amman supports Palestinian aspirations for a state within 1967 boundaries.

According to a 2022 public opinion poll conducted by the Center for Strategic Studies Jordan at the University of Jordan, 87% of the surveyed population at the grassroots level and 92% of the experts called Palestinian cause a top regional issue.

=== 2023–present ===
As a consequence of the conflict between Israel and Hamas, the political landscape of Jordan has been impacted. Bisher al Khasawneh, the Prime Minister of Jordan, expressed his country's disapproval of Israel's offensive in Gaza by recalling its ambassador from Israel. Additionally, Jordan declared that Israel's ambassador, who had departed Amman following Hamas' attack, would not be permitted to return. Khasawneh emphasized that Jordan is considering all available options in its response to the Israeli aggression on Gaza and its subsequent consequences. Khasawneh argued that Israel's blockade of the heavily populated Gaza Strip cannot be justified as self-defense, contrary to their claims. He further emphasized that the Israeli assault does not differentiate between civilian and military objectives, even targeting safe zones and ambulances.

During the Gaza war, in early November 2023 and March 2024, Jordan provided urgent medical assistance to Gaza. The Jordanian Air Force delivered several airdrops with humanitarian aid in cooperation with French, Dutch and United States Air Forces.

== Today ==
Jordan has an office in Ramallah, in the West Bank, while Palestine has an embassy in Amman.

They are both member states of the Arab League.

Jordan and Palestine are also members of the Union for the Mediterranean and the Organisation of Islamic Cooperation.

== See also ==
- Foreign relations of Palestine
- Foreign relations of Jordan
- Israel–Jordan relations
