= Israel–Jordan relations =

Bilateral relations between Israel and Jordan

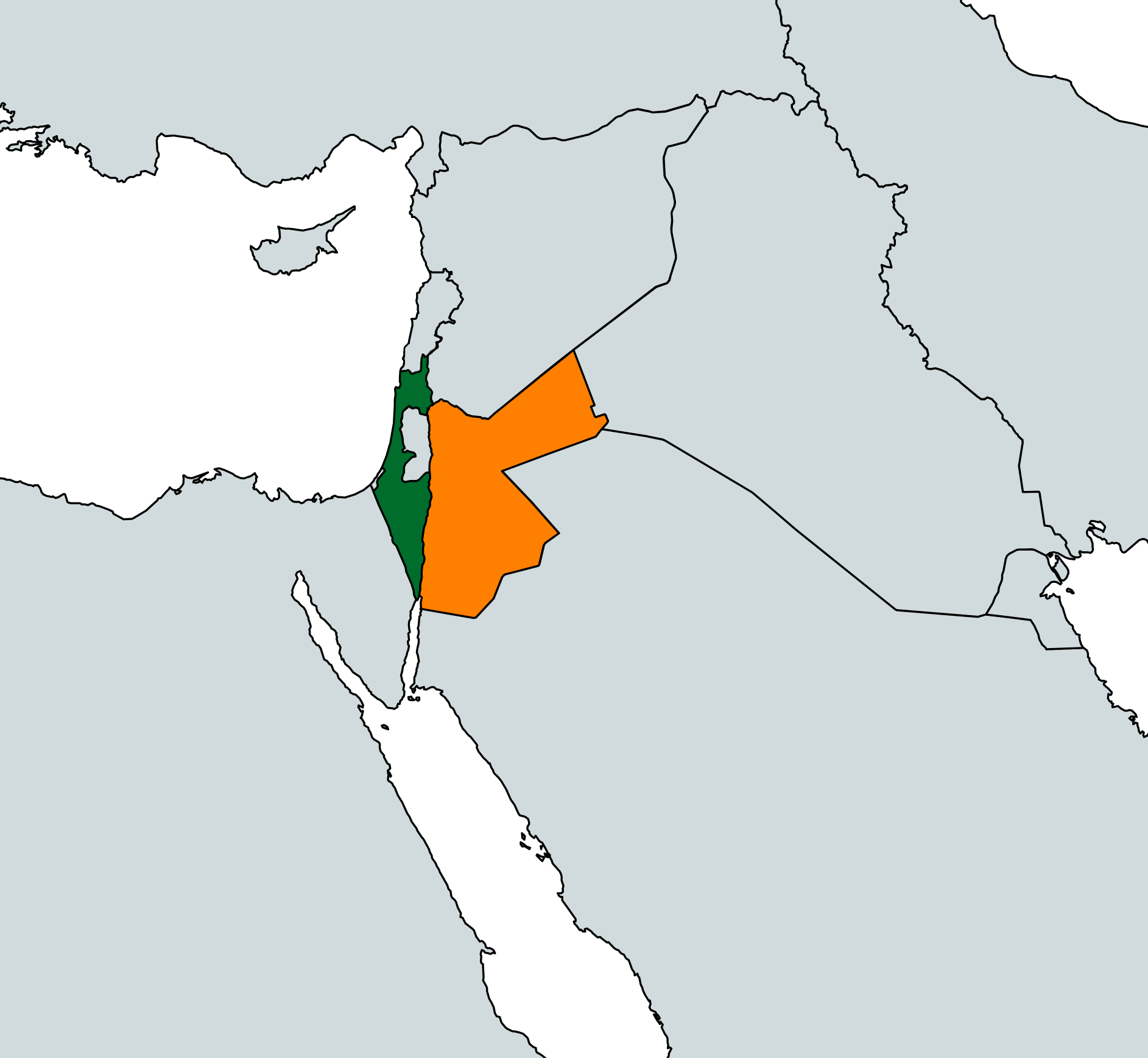

- Israel: Jordan

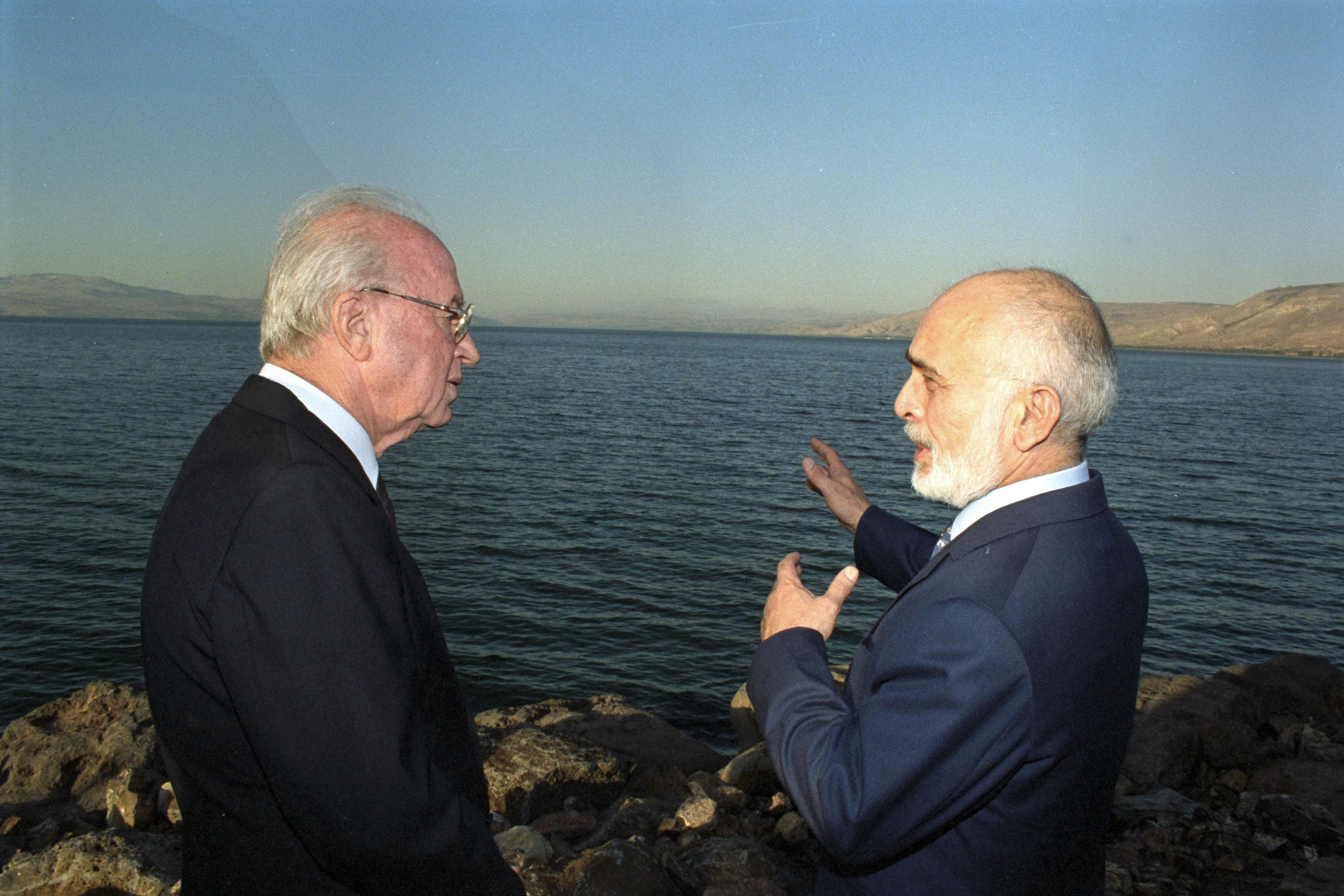
King Hussein and Prime Minister Yitzhak Rabin at the Lake Tiberias, in 1994

Israel–Jordan relations are the diplomatic, economic and cultural relations between Israel and Jordan. The two countries share a land border, with three border crossings: Yitzhak Rabin/Wadi Araba Crossing, Jordan River Crossing and the Allenby/King Hussein Bridge Crossing, that connects the West Bank with Jordan. The relationship between the two countries is regulated by the Israel–Jordan peace treaty in 1994, which formally ended the state of war between the two countries since the establishment of the State of Israel in 1948 and provided the platform for diplomatic and trade relations. On 8 October 2020, Israel and Jordan signed an agreement allowing flights to cross over each other's airspace. Jordan helped intercept Iranian drones during the strikes in Israel in April 2024.

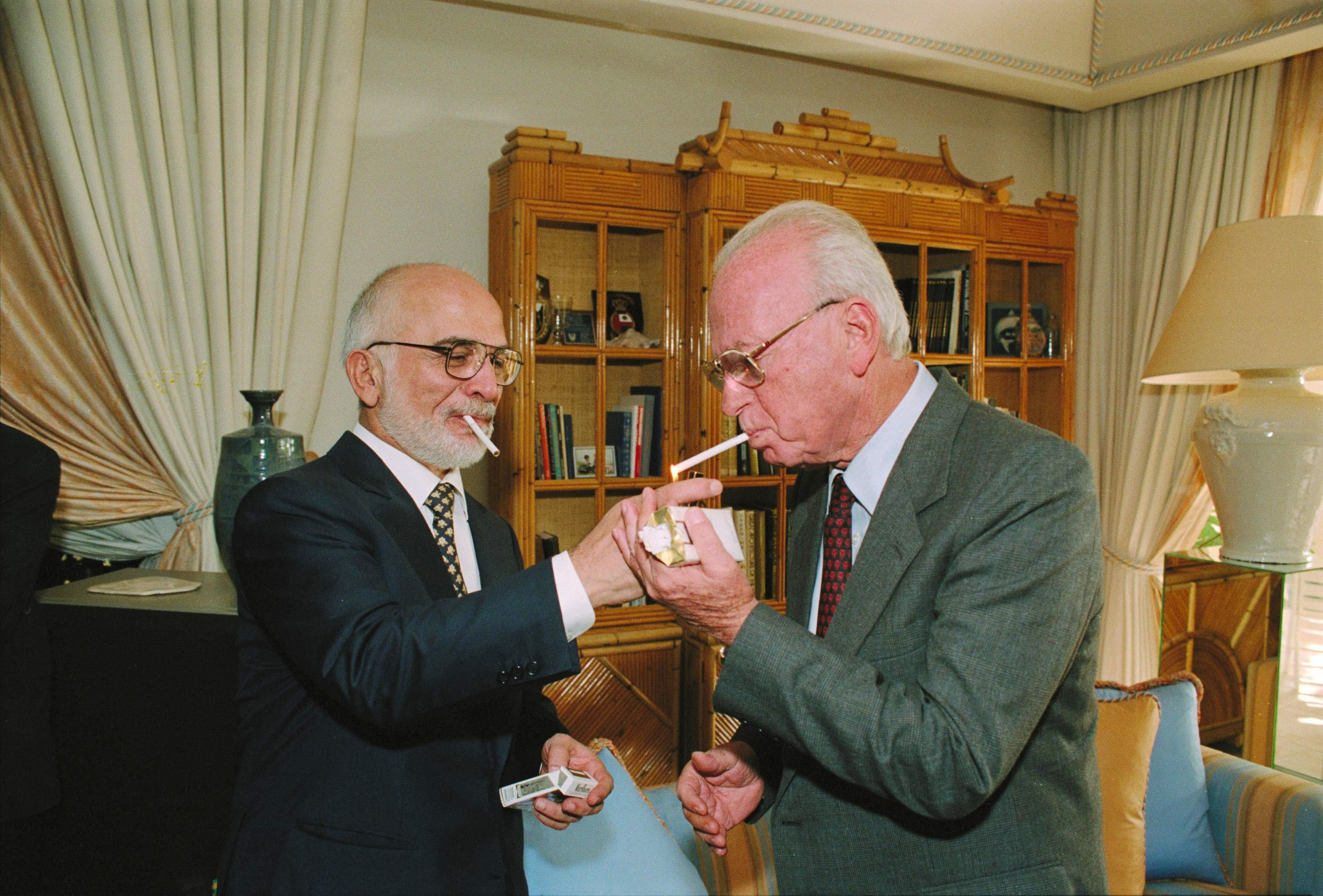
King Hussein lighting Rabin's cigarette at his residence in Aqaba, 1994

== History ==
=== 1948–1994 ===
Between 1948 and 1994, Jordan adopted an anti-Zionist policy but made decisions pragmatically. Several factors are cited for this, among them geographic proximity, King Hussein's Western orientation, and Jordan's modest territorial aspirations. Nevertheless, a state of war existed between the two countries from 1948 until the treaty was signed.

Memoirists and political analysts have identified a number of "back-channel" and clandestine communications between the two countries which led to cooperation even during times of war.

Jordan (then Transjordan) was not a member of the United Nations when the vote on the United Nations Partition Plan for Palestine was held in November 1947, but following Israel's founding on 14 May 1948, it was one of the Arab League countries that invaded the country, gaining control of the West Bank and East Jerusalem (including the Old City). The Jewish population was expelled and Jordan annexed these territories.

In the 1967 Six-Day War, Jordan aligned itself with Nasser's Egypt despite an Israeli warning, and lost control of the West Bank and East Jerusalem to Israel, but did not relinquish its claim to the territory until 1988. Jordan significantly reduced its military participation in the Yom Kippur War in 1973 against Israel. Jordan and Israel signed the Israel-Jordan Treaty of Peace in 1994, normalizing relations between the two countries.

In 1970, King Hussein waged the war of Black September against the Palestine Liberation Organization (PLO), eventually ejecting the organization and thousands of Palestinians who threatened Hussein's rule. During Black September, Syrian troops invaded the kingdom, threatening to further destabilize the regime. In response, the Israeli Air Force made a series of overflights over the Syrian forces, prompting them to return to Syria. The war against the PLO factions strengthened ties between Israel and Jordan. The Mossad is said to have warned Hussein about a Palestinian assassination attempt and Hussein warned Israeli Prime Minister Golda Meir in a clandestine face-to-face meeting about Egyptian and Syrian threats prior to the 1973 Yom Kippur War. Hussein's intention was to stay out of the war.

In 1987, Israeli Foreign Affairs Minister Shimon Peres and King Hussein secretly devised a peace plan in which Israel would concede the West Bank to Jordan. The two signed the "Peres–Hussein London Agreement", defining a framework for a Middle Eastern peace conference. It fell through due to the objection of Israeli Prime Minister Yitzhak Shamir. The following year Jordan abandoned its claim for the West Bank in favor of a peaceful resolution between Israel and the PLO.

=== Israel–Jordan peace treaty ===
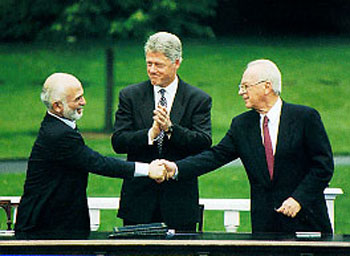
A handshake between Hussein I of Jordan and Yitzhak Rabin, accompanied by Bill Clinton, during the Israel-Jordan peace negotiations, 26 October 1994

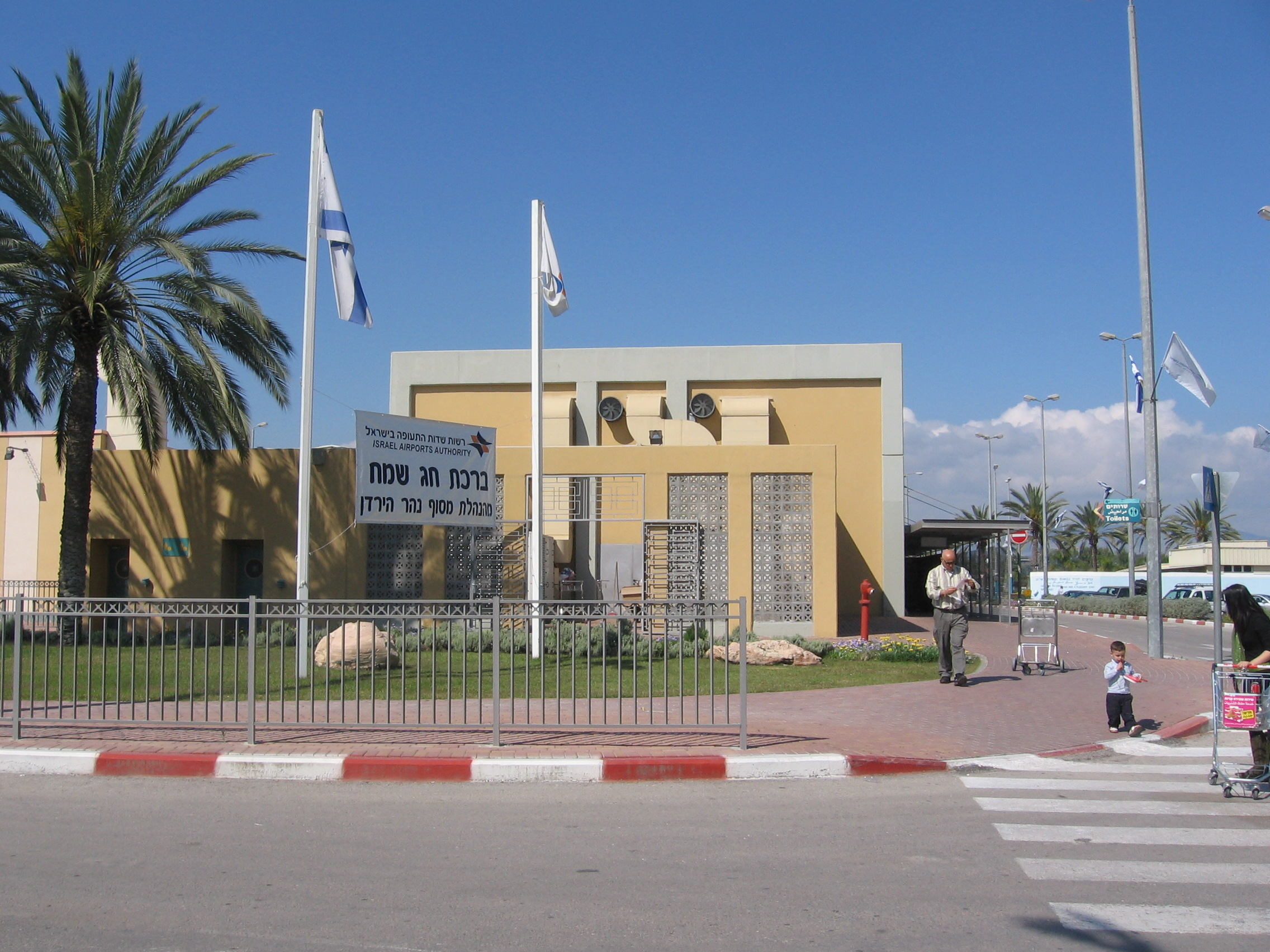
Jordan River Crossing

In 1994, Israel and Jordan negotiated a peace treaty, which was signed by Yitzhak Rabin, King Hussein and Bill Clinton in Washington, DC on 25 July 1994. The Washington Declaration says that Israel and Jordan ended the official state of enmity and would start negotiations to achieve an "end to bloodshed and sorrow" and a just and lasting peace.

On 26 October 1994, Jordan and Israel signed a peace treaty, normalizing relations between them and resolving territorial disputes, including water sharing. The treaty adjusted land and water disputes, and provided for broad cooperation in tourism and trade. It also included a pledge that neither Jordan nor Israel would allow its territory to become a staging ground for military strikes by a third country. The treaty was closely linked to efforts to achieve peace between Israel and the Palestinians.

Following the agreements, Israel and Jordan opened their borders. Several border-crossings were erected, allowing tourists, businessmen and workers to travel between the two countries. Israeli tourists started to visit Jordan, and many foreign tourists would combine visits to both countries.

In 1996, the two countries signed a trade treaty. As part of the agreement, Israel assisted in establishing a modern medical center in Amman.

=== 2010–present ===
In 2010, when the government of Jordan sought permission from international governments to produce nuclear fuel for use in Jordanian power plants, Israel objected, citing the unstable political nature of the Middle East. In light of the Israeli objection the request for United States approval was denied.

In a meeting with the Centre for Israel & Jewish Affairs in Canada, Jordanian King Abdullah noted that Israel, which he recognizes as a vital regional ally, has been highly responsive to requests by Abdullah to resume direct peace talks between Israel and the Palestinian Authority. Promoting peace between Israel and the Palestinian Authority is a major priority for Jordan. It supports U.S. efforts to mediate a final settlement, which it believes should be based on the 2002 Arab Peace Initiative, proposed by Saudi Arabia.

On 23 July 2017, the deputy director of security of the Israeli embassy in Amman shot two Jordanian men. The Jordanian Public Security Directorate concluded that the Israeli guard was attacked by one of the men, a 17-year-old furniture repairman, and shot at both the repairman and the building’s Jordanian owner. The Israeli Ministry of Foreign Affairs reported that the furniture repairman had been wielding a screwdriver, a claim the father of the Jordanian youth denies. Both Jordanian men died and the Israeli guard was injured as a result of the incident.

On 22 November 2019, King Abdullah described Jordan's relations with Israel as being "at an all-time low", mostly because of domestic political issues in Israel.

In March 2021, Jordan delayed approval of Israeli Prime Minister Benjamin Netanyahu's flight over the country on the way to the United Arab Emirates. Israel accused Jordan of doing this deliberately as a response to a dispute over Israeli entry permits for Jordanian Crown Prince Hussein bin Abdullah's security detail for a trip to the Al-Aqsa mosque. Jordanian Foreign Minister Ayman Safadi accused Israel of breaching agreed terms of the trip to Al-Aqsa and accused Netanyahu of "toying with the region and its peoples’ right to live in peace for the sake of electoral and populist concerns" and "destroying the trust which is the basis for ending the conflict".

In April 2021, Jordan condemned Israel for raiding the Al-Aqsa mosque in Jerusalem and silencing the minaret's loudspeaker. However, on 8 July of that year, reports surfaced that Israeli Prime Minister Naftali Bennett met with King Abdullah in what was said to be a "very positive" atmosphere. The report, leaked by an anonymous former Israeli official, said that Bennett and King Abdullah agreed to open a "new page" in relations, after the strained relations of the past years. More specifically, it said that Israel agreed to double the amount of water they sold to Jordan. Bennett's office declined to comment on the report.

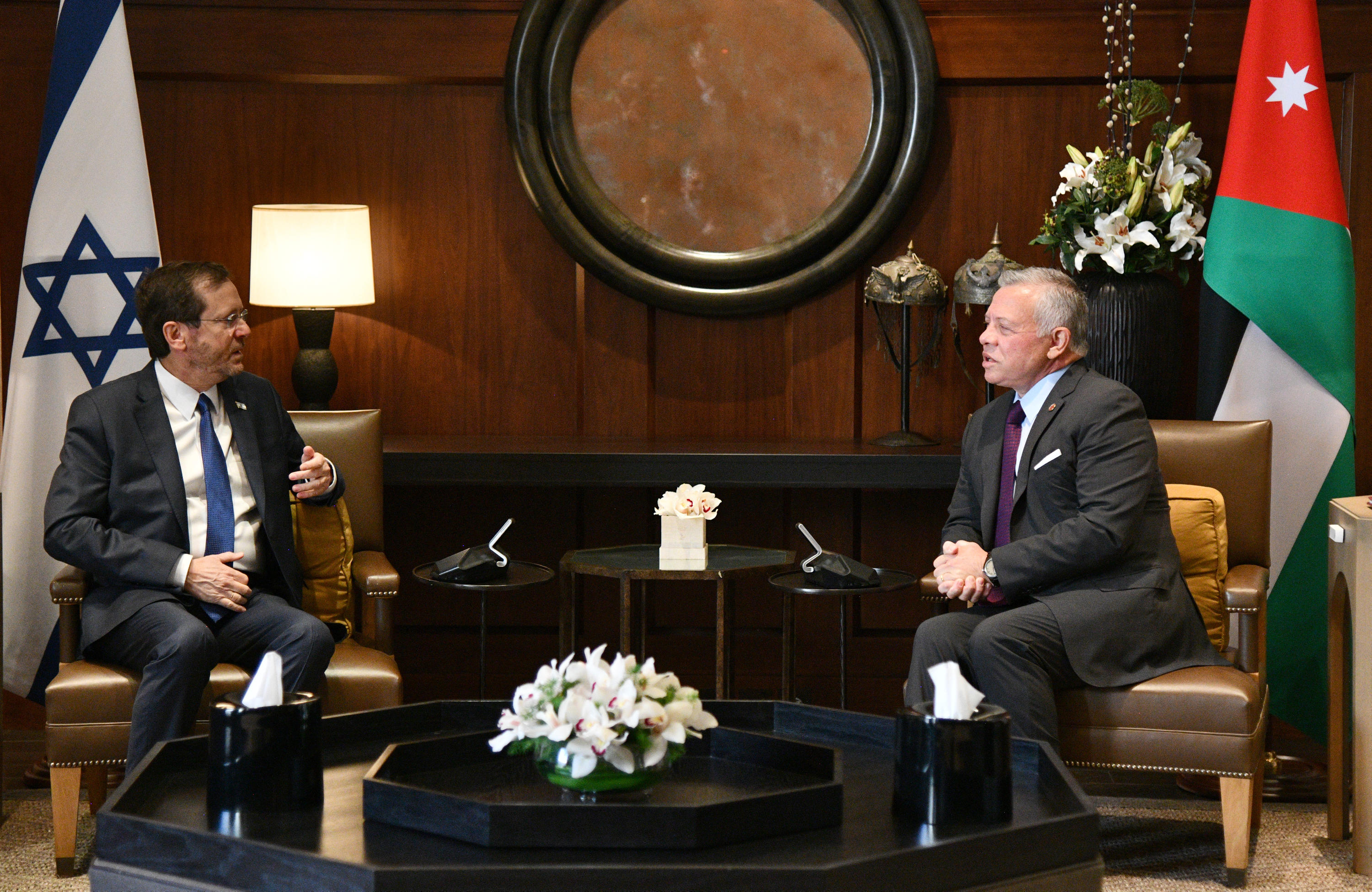
King Abdullah II of Jordan and Israeli president Isaac Herzog in Amman, Jordan, 30 March 2022

In early September 2021, King Abdullah and Israeli president Isaac Herzog discussed sustainability, climate crisis, and energy in an unannounced meeting. On 5 January 2022, Abdullah met with Israeli Minister of Defense Benny Gantz in Amman. They discussed regional stability and bilateral ties. Abdullah stated "the need to maintain calm in the Palestinian territories" and called for a two-state solution as a "comprehensive and just solution" of the conflict. It was the first public hosting of an Israeli official by Abdullah in more than four years. According to observers, it was part of a reset of bilateral relations between Jordan and Israel. On 30 March 2022, King Abdullah met with Israeli president Isaac Herzog in Amman. They discussed the Israeli-Palestinian conflict, and bilateral relations. It was the first official visit of an Israeli president to Jordan.

In an interview with CNN in December 2022, after the inauguration of the new Israeli government, King Abdullah warned Israel not to change the status of the Muslim and Christian holy sites and stated "If people [Israeli government] want to get into a conflict with us, we're quite prepared".

In April 2023, Jordanian MP Imad Al-Adwan was arrested by Israeli authorities after trying to smuggle weapons and gold into the West Bank.

==== 2023 Israel's Gaza war ====
In October 2023, during the Gaza war, King Abdullah condemned Israel's blockade of the Gaza Strip and the "collective punishment" of Palestinians in Gaza. On 1 November 2023, Jordan recalled its ambassador to Israel, accusing the country of creating an “unprecedented humanitarian catastrophe” and “killing innocent people in Gaza”. Jordan also declared that Israel's ambassador, who had departed Amman following Hamas' attack, would not be permitted to return.

In November 2023, Bisher al Khasawneh, the prime minister of Jordan, said that Jordan was considering all available options in its response to the Israeli aggression on Gaza and its subsequent consequences. Khasawneh argued that Israel's blockade of the heavily populated Gaza Strip could not be justified as self-defense, and criticised the indiscriminate Israeli assault, which had included safe zones and ambulances in its targets. Jordanian residents (including the approximately 2 million Palestinian refugees and others with Palestinian roots) have staged protests against Israel's actions in Gaza, which adds pressure to the government to take action on the issue. There is also evidence that there is more sympathy with Hamas among Jordanians in recent years. However, Jordan's Western allies view the kingdom as a potentially vital mediator, should Israel and Hamas agree to negotiate. King Abdullah has been taking part in diplomatic meetings in Europe, aiming to secure safe passage of humanitarian aid; however, the government is also grappling with domestic problems such as inflation, unemployment, and trafficking of arms and drugs through Jordan to the West Bank. The king and Queen Rania have criticised Israel's action in Gaza, and called for a ceasefire. Queen Rania, whose family is Palestinian with roots in the West Bank town of Nablus, called on Western leaders to denounce Israel's attacks on Palestinian civilians in an interview aired on CNN in the U.S. There are fears of a huge influx of refugees into Jordan as a result of the Gaza war.

During the April 2024 Iranian strikes in Israel Jordan intercepted Iranian projectiles that violated its airspace with their air force.

== Economic relations ==
Jordan has also benefited economically from the peace treaty. As a result of the treaty, Qualified Industrial Zones were developed in Jordan. In these zones, companies that use a percentage of Israeli inputs can export duty-free to the United States. As of 2010, the zones have generated 36,000 jobs, and have become the strongest engine for Jordan's economic growth. The opposition Muslim Brotherhood movement has asked the government to shut them down, but the government maintains that the zones provide jobs for thousands of Jordanians.

Israel has facilitated Jordanian trade with Iraq and Turkey since 2013 by allowing goods to be transported by truck via the Jordan River Crossing near Beit She'an. The goods are taken to Haifa Port and shipped from there to Iraq and Turkey. Previously this trade passed overland through Syria but has been disrupted by the Syrian Civil War.

According to a 2016 agreement valued at US$10 billion, Israel will supply Jordan with 45 billion cubic meters (BCM) of natural gas over 15 years. The gas will be supplied by a new pipeline scheduled for completion by 2020 that will stretch from the Israel–Jordan border to the Arab Gas Pipeline near Mafraq. The Jordanian government maintains that procuring gas from Israel will save Jordan JD700 million per year in energy costs. The pipeline started its initial 3-month operation on 31 December 2019, despite heated protests by opposition groups. Local campaign coordinators against the deal criticised the high costs when the country is already receiving cheap liquified gas through a port in Aqaba, as well as additional electricity produced by solar power plants.

In November 2021, Jordan and Israel signed an agreement brokered by the United Arab Emirates by which a UAE company will build a solar power plant in Jordan from which Israel will buy electricity in exchange for water from an Israeli desalination plant.

== See also ==
- History of the Jews in Jordan
- International recognition of Israel
- Island of Peace
- Jordan–Palestine relations
