= PHG =

PHG may refer to:

- Palestinian Hydrology Group
- PHG helmet
- PHG (book), short for "Perls Hefferline Goodman", as those authors' 1951 book Gestalt Therapy is known in its community
- Phenibut, a medicine
- Pure homopolar generator, an electric generator
- Graduate of Pharmacy, PhG or Ph.G.
