= List of wars involving Israel =

This is an index of lists detailing military conflicts involving Israel. Since its declaration of independence in May 1948, the State of Israel has fought various wars with its neighbouring Arab states, two major Palestinian Arab uprisings known as the First Intifada and the Second Intifada (see Israeli–Palestinian conflict), and a broad series of other armed engagements rooted in the Arab–Israeli conflict.

== Wars and other conflicts ==
Israel has been involved in a number of wars and large-scale military operations, including:

- 1948 Arab–Israeli War (November 1947 – July 1949) – Started as 6 months of civil war between Jewish and Arab militias when the mandate period in Palestine was ending and turned into a regular war after the establishment of Israel and the intervention of several Arab armies. In its conclusion, a set of agreements were signed between Israel, Egypt, Jordan, Lebanon, and Syria, called the 1949 Armistice Agreements, which established the armistice lines between Israel and its neighbours, also known as the Green Line.
- Palestinian Fedayeen insurgency (1950s–1960s) – Palestinian attacks and reprisal operations carried out by the Israel Defense Forces during the 1950s and 1960s. These actions were in response to constant fedayeen incursions during which Arab guerrillas infiltrated from Syria, Egypt, and Jordan into Israel to carry out attacks against Israeli civilians and soldiers. The policy of the reprisal operations was exceptional due to Israel's declared aim of getting a high 'blood cost' among the enemy side which was believed to be necessary in order to deter them from committing future attacks.
- Suez Crisis (October 1956–March 1957) – A military attack on Egypt by Britain, France, and Israel, beginning on 29 October 1956, with the intention to occupy the Sinai Peninsula and to take over the Suez Canal and the Egyptian-occupied Gaza Strip. The attack followed Egypt's decision of 26 July 1956 to nationalize the Suez Canal after the withdrawal of an offer by Britain and the United States to fund the building of the Aswan Dam. Although the Coalition invasion of the Sinai was successful, the United States and USSR forced it to retreat. Even so, Israel managed to re-open the Straits of Tiran and pacified its southern border.
- Six-Day War (June 1967) – Fought between Israel and Arab neighbors Egypt, Jordan, and Syria. The nations of Iraq, Saudi Arabia, Kuwait, Algeria, and others also contributed troops and arms to the Arab forces. Following the war, the territory held by Israel expanded significantly ("The Purple Line"): The West Bank (including East Jerusalem) from Jordan, Golan Heights from Syria, Sinai and Gaza from Egypt.
- War of Attrition (July 1967–August 1970) – A limited war fought between Israel and Egypt, the Soviet Union, Jordan, Syria, and the Palestine Liberation Organization from 1967 to 1970. It was initiated by the Egyptians as a way of recapturing the Sinai from the Israelis, who had been in control of the territory since June 1967. The hostilities ended with a ceasefire signed between the countries in 1970 with frontiers remaining in the same place as when the war began.
- Yom Kippur War (October 1973) – Fought from 6 to 25 October 1973 by a coalition of Arab states led by Egypt and Syria against Israel as a way of recapturing part of the territories which they lost to the Israelis back in the Six-Day War in 1967. The war began with a surprise joint attack by Egypt and Syria on the Jewish holiday of Yom Kippur. Egypt and Syria crossed the cease-fire lines in the Sinai and Golan Heights, respectively. The Israel Defense Forces (IDF) managed to turn the tides of the war after a successful counterattack before a UN-mandated ceasefire took place on 25 October with subsequent peace talks initiating between Egypt and Israel.
- Palestinian insurgency in South Lebanon (1971–1982) – The PLO relocated to South Lebanon from Jordan, staged attacks on the Galilee, and used South Lebanon as a base for international operations. In 1978, Israel launched Operation Litani – the first Israeli invasion of Lebanon, which was carried out by the Israel Defense Forces in order to expel PLO forces from the territory. Continuing ground and rocket attacks, and Israeli retaliations, eventually escalate into the 1982 War.
- 1982 Lebanon War (1982) – Began on 6 June 1982, when the Israel Defense Forces invaded southern Lebanon to expel the PLO from the territory. The Government of Israel ordered the invasion as a response to the assassination attempt against Israel's ambassador to the United Kingdom, Shlomo Argov, by the Abu Nidal Organization and due to the constant terror attacks on northern Israel made by the Palestinian guerrilla organizations which resided in Lebanon. The war resulted in the expulsion of the PLO from Lebanon and created an Israeli Security Zone in southern Lebanon.
- South Lebanon conflict (1982–2000) – Nearly 18 years of warfare between the Israel Defense Forces and its Lebanese Christian proxy militias against Lebanese Muslim guerrilla forces, led by Iranian-backed Hezbollah, within what was defined by Israelis as the "Security Zone" in South Lebanon.
- First Intifada (1987–1993) – First large-scale Palestinian uprising against Israel in the West Bank and the Gaza Strip.
- Second Intifada (2000–2005) – Second Palestinian uprising, a period of intensified violence, which began in late September 2000.
- Israel–Hezbollah War (2006) – Began as a military operation in response to the abduction of two Israeli reserve soldiers by the Hezbollah. The operation gradually strengthened, to become a wider confrontation. The principal participants were Hezbollah paramilitary forces and the Israeli military. The conflict started on 12 July 2006 and continued until a United Nations-brokered ceasefire went into effect on 14 August 2006, though it formally ended on 8 September 2006, when Israel lifted its naval blockade of Lebanon. The war resulted in a stalemate.
- Gaza War or Operation Cast Lead (December 2008 – January 2009) – Three-week armed conflict between Israel and Hamas during the winter of 2008–2009. In an escalation of the ongoing Israeli–Palestinian conflict, Israel responded to ongoing rocket fire from the Gaza Strip with military force in an action titled "Operation Cast Lead". Israel opened the attack with a surprise air strike on 27 December 2008. Israel's stated aim was to stop such rocket fire from and the import of arms into Gaza. Israeli forces attacked military and civilian targets, police stations, and government buildings in the opening assault. Israel declared an end to the conflict on 18 January and completed its withdrawal on 21 January 2009.
- 2012 Gaza War or Operation Pillar of Defense (November 2012) – Military offensive on the Gaza Strip.
- 2014 Gaza War or Operation Protective Edge (July–August 2014) – Military offensive on the Gaza Strip as a response to the collapse of American-sponsored peace talks, attempts by rival Palestinian factions to form a coalition government, the kidnapping and murder of three Israeli teenagers, the subsequent kidnapping and murder of a Palestinian teenager, and increased rocket attacks on Israel by Hamas militants.
- Syrian Civil War and the Iran–Israel conflict during the Syrian civil war.
- 2021 Israel–Palestine crisis or Operation Guardian of the Walls (May 2021) – Riots between Jews and Arabs in Israeli cities. Hamas fired rockets into Israel, with Iron Dome intercepting the most dangerous projectiles. Israel began airstrikes in Gaza.
- Gaza war or Operation Iron Swords (October 2023–present) – After the October 7 attacks from the Gaza Strip into Southern Israel on 7 October 2023, Israel responded with a devastating bombing campaign and invaded the Strip. The war has created a humanitarian crisis in the Strip and an ongoing famine, with experts stating that Israel is perpetrating a genocide against Gazans through its conduct in the war.
- Israeli invasion of Lebanon or Operation Northern Arrows (September–November 2024).
- Israeli invasion of Syria or Operation Arrow of Bashan (2024–present)
- Twelve-Day War or Operation Rising Lion (June 2025).
- 2026 Iran war or Operation Roaring Lion (Note: Hebrew: מִבְצַע שְׁאָגַת הָאֲרִי, romanized: Mivtsá She'agát Ha'arí, pronounced [mivˈt͡sä ʃe̞.äˈɡätʰ hä.ʔäˈʁi]) (February 2026–present)

== Table ==
Conflicts considered as wars by the Israeli Ministry of Defense (as they were named by Israel in small text) are marked in bold.

Conflict	Combatant 1	Combatant 2	Results	Israeli commanders			Israeli losses	
Conflict	Combatant 1	Combatant 2	Results	Israeli Prime Minister	Defense Minister of Israel	Chief of Staff of the IDF	IDF forces	Civilians
**1948 Palestine war** War of Independence (1947–1949)	**Yishuv** (before 14 May 1948); **Israel** (after 14 May 1948) Before 26 May 1948: Haganah; Palmach; Hish Corps; HIM Corps; Irgun; Lehi; Druze militants; Allied Bedouin tribes; After 26 May 1948: Israel Defense Forces; Sword Battalion; Foreign volunteers: Mahal	**Arab Higher Committee** (before 15 May 1948); **Arab League** (after 15 May 1948): Arab Liberation Army; Holy War Army; Al-Najjada; Egypt; All-Palestine Protectorate (after 22 Sep 1948); Transjordan; Syria; Iraq; Lebanon; Saudi Arabia; Yemen; **United Kingdom**; Mandatory Palestine (before 15 May 1948)	**Israeli victory**: 1949 Armistice Agreements: Establishment of the State of Israel; Occupation of the Gaza Strip by Egypt and establishment of the All-Palestine Government; Annexation of the West Bank by Jordan (including East Jerusalem); Syrian foothold established to the north and south of the Sea of Galilee	David Ben-Gurion		Yaakov Dori	4,074	~2,000
**Suez Crisis** Sinai War (1956–1957)	Israel; United Kingdom; France	Egypt	**Inconclusive**: Coalition military victory with the Israeli occupation of the Sinai Peninsula and the Gaza Strip until March 1957; Egyptian political victory	David Ben-Gurion		Moshe Dayan	231	None
**Six-Day War** (1967)	Israel	Egypt; Syria; Jordan; Iraq; Minor involvement: Lebanon	**Victory**: Israel occupies a total of 70,000 km^{2} (27,000 sq mi) of territory: The Golan Heights from Syria; The West Bank including East Jerusalem from Jordan; The Gaza Strip and the Sinai Peninsula from Egypt	Levi Eshkol	Moshe Dayan	Yitzhak Rabin	776–983	20
**War of Attrition** (1967–1970)	Israel	Egypt; Soviet Union; Kuwait; PLO; Jordan; Syria; Cuba	**Inconclusive**	Golda Meir	Moshe Dayan	Haim Bar-Lev	1,424	227
**Yom Kippur War** (1973)	Israel	Egypt; Syria; Expeditionary forces Saudi Arabia Algeria Jordan Libya Iraq Kuwait Tunisia Morocco Cuba North Korea	**Victory**: At the final ceasefire: Egyptian forces held 1,200 km^{2} (460 sq mi) on the eastern bank of the canal.; Israeli forces held 1,600 km^{2} (620 sq mi) on the western bank of the canal.; Israeli forces held 500 km^{2} (193 sq mi) of the Syrian Bashan region of the Golan Heights.	Golda Meir	Moshe Dayan			
**1978 South Lebanon conflict** Operation Litani (1978)	Israel; SLA	PLO	**Victory**: Palestinian withdrawal from South Lebanon	Menachem Begin	Ezer Weizman	Mordechai Gur	18	None
**1982 Lebanon War** First Lebanon War / Operation Peace Galilee (1982)	**Israel**; Lebanese Forces; South Lebanon Army	**PLO**; Syria; Others: Lebanese National Resistance Front; Al-Mourabitoun; PKK	**Inconclusive**: Israeli tactical victories; Israeli strategic failures (Note: Sources:); PLO expulsion from Lebanon.; End of the Palestinian insurgency in South Lebanon; Beginning of the South Lebanon conflict (1985–2000); Start of the Israeli occupation of Southern Lebanon	Menachem Begin	Ariel Sharon	Rafael Eitan	657	2–3
**South Lebanon conflict** Security Zone Campaign (1982–2000)	Israel; South Lebanon Army	Hezbollah; Amal; Lebanese Communist Party; Jammoul; PFLP–GC	**Defeat**: Collapse of the SLA and its provisional government; Israeli withdrawal and end of its occupation of Southern Lebanon	Shimon Peres	Yitzhak Rabin	Moshe Levi	559	7
**First Intifada** (1987–1993)	Israel	Al-Qiyada al-Muwhhada; Fatah; Popular Front for the Liberation of Palestine; Democratic Front for the Liberation of Palestine; Palestinian Communist Party; Hamas; Palestinian Islamic Jihad	**Palestinian Uprising suppressed**: Madrid Conference; Oslo I Accord; Israel–PLO Letters of Mutual Recognition; Establishment of the Palestinian National Authority; Creation of the West Bank "Areas" by the Oslo II Accord in 1995	Yitzhak Shamir	Yitzhak Rabin	Dan Shomron	60	100
**Second Intifada** (2000–2005)	Israel	Palestinian Authority; PLO; Fatah; Popular Front for the Liberation of Palestine; Democratic Front for the Liberation of Palestine; Hamas; Palestinian Islamic Jihad; Popular Resistance Committees	**Victory**: Palestinian uprising suppressed.; Israeli forces withdraw from the Gaza Strip; Israel initiates the Gaza disengagement plan; Israel constructs the West Bank barrier	Ariel Sharon	Shaul Mofaz	Moshe Ya'alon	301	773
**2006 Lebanon War** Second Lebanon War / Operation Just Reward (2006)	**Israel**	**Hezbollah** Allies: Amal; Popular Guard; PFLP-GC; Iran (Ynet report); ICU (U.N. report)	**Inconclusive**: Ceasefire through UNSCR 1701	Ehud Olmert	Amir Peretz	Dan Halutz	121	44
**Gaza War** Operation Cast Lead (2008–2009)	Israel; Israel Defense Forces; Israel Security Agency	Gaza Strip; Hamas; (Hamas) Ezzedeen al-Qassam Brigades; Popular Front for the Liberation of Palestine; (Popular Front for the Liberation of Palestine) Abu Ali Mustapha Brigades; Islamic Jihad Movement in Palestine; (Palestinian Islamic Jihad) Al-Quds Brigades; Al-Aqsa Martyrs' Brigades; Popular Resistance Committees	**Victory**: IDF declared unilateral ceasefire, 12 hours later Hamas announced a one-week ceasefire.; Humanitarian crisis and deterioration of infrastructure and basic services in Gaza.; Temporary reduction in the number of rockets being fired from the Gaza Strip.; See results	Ehud Olmert	Ehud Barak	Gabi Ashkenazi	10	3
**Gaza War** Operation Pillar of Defense (2012)	Israel	Gaza Strip; Hamas; (Hamas) Al-Qassam Brigades; Palestinian Islamic Jihad; Popular Front for the Liberation of Palestine–General Command; Popular Front for the Liberation of Palestine; Democratic Front for the Liberation of Palestine; Popular Resistance Committees; Al-Aqsa Martyrs' Brigades; Jaysh al-Ummah	**Ceasefire**: both sides claim victory; According to Israel, the operation "severely impaired Hamas's launching capabilities."; According to Hamas, their rocket strikes led to the ceasefire deal; Cessation of rocket fire from Gaza into Israel.; Gaza fishermen allowed 6 nmi (11 km) out to sea for fishing; reduced back to 3 nmi (6 km) after 22 March 2013	Benjamin Netanyahu	Ehud Barak	Benny Gantz	2	4
**Gaza War** Operation Protective Edge (2014)	Israel	Gaza Strip; Hamas; Palestinian Islamic Jihad; Democratic Front for the Liberation of Palestine; Popular Front for the Liberation of Palestine; Popular Resistance Committees; Al-Aqsa Martyrs' Brigades; Abdullah Azzam Brigades; Jaysh al-Ummah	**Both sides claim victory**: According to Hamas, Israel was repelled from Gaza; According to Israel, Hamas was severely weakened and achieved none of its demands	Benjamin Netanyahu	Moshe Ya'alon	Benny Gantz	67	6
**Israel–Palestine crisis** (2021)	Israel; Israel Defense Forces; Israeli Air Force; Israel Police; Israel Border Police; Shin Bet; Jewish Israeli protesters	Gaza Strip; Hamas; Palestinian Islamic Jihad; Popular Front for the Liberation of Palestine; Al-Aqsa Martyrs' Brigades; Smaller militant groups (Note: Besides Hamas and the Palestinian Islamic Jihad, FDD's Long War Journal identified the following militant groups as having fought in the 2021 conflict: Jihad Jibril Brigades, Humat al-Aqsa, Jaysh al-Ummah, Katibat al-Sheikh al-Emireen, Mujahideen Brigades, Abdul al-Qadir al-Husseini Brigades, and two al-Aqsa Martyrs Brigades splinter factions.); Protesters in Israel and Palestine: Arab Israeli protesters; Palestinian protesters in the West Bank and Jerusalem; Jordanian, Lebanese, and Syrian protesters (see international)	**Victory claimed by both sides**: Return to status quo ante bellum; ceasefire went into effect; Halting of both Israeli airstrikes inside the Gaza Strip and Palestinian rocket fire into Israel	Benjamin Netanyahu	Benny Gantz	Aviv Kochavi	1	14
**Gaza war** Operation Iron Swords (2023–present)	Israel (Note: See List of military aid to Israel during the Gaza war and American involvement) Allies: Popular Forces (Note: Popular Forces have been described as a Salafi Jihadist organisation with alleged ties to the Islamic State. Several senior leaders in the Popular Forces also allied with the Islamic State in the Sinai.) (Note: From May 2024)	Hamas Palestinian allies: Palestinian Islamic Jihad Popular Front for the Liberation of Palestine Democratic Front for the Liberation of Palestine Al-Aqsa Martyrs' Brigades Palestinian Mujahideen Movement Palestinian Freedom Movement Popular Resistance Committees Popular Front for the Liberation of Palestine – General Command; (Palestine) Abdul al-Qadir al-Husseini Brigades Jaysh al-Ummah	**Ongoing**	Benjamin Netanyahu	Yoav Gallant (until November 2024) Israel Katz (after November 2024)	Herzi Halevi	1,087+	1,002+
**Israel–Hezbollah conflict** Operation Northern Arrows (2023–2024)	Israel	Hezbollah Allies: Amal Islamic Group SSNP-L Hamas PIJ Popular Resistance Committees Popular Front for the Liberation of Palestine Islamic Resistance in Iraq (Yemen) Houthi movement Iran Syria (until 2024) Islamic Azz Brigades	**Ongoing**	Benjamin Netanyahu	Yoav Gallant (until November 2024) Israel Katz (after November 2024)	Herzi Halevi	87+	46+
Israeli invasion of Syria Operation Arrow of Bashan (2024–present)	Israel Administrative Council of Jabal Bashan	Syria	**Ongoing**: Israel re-occupies the UNDOF zone	Benjamin Netanyahu	Israel Katz	Herzi Halevi	1	0
**Twelve-Day War** Operation Rising Lion (2025)	Israel; United States	Iran; Houthis	**Ceasefire**: Ceasefire between Iran and Israel	Benjamin Netanyahu	Israel Katz	Eyal Zamir	1	31
**2026 Iran war** (2026)	Israel; United States	Iran; Hezbollah (Yemen) Houthis Islamic Resistance in Iraq	**Ongoing**	Benjamin Netanyahu	Israel Katz	Eyal Zamir	4	24
2026 Lebanon war	Israel	Hezbollah; Iran	**Ongoing**	Benjamin Netanyahu	Israel Katz	Eyal Zamir	22	2

== Lengths of Israel combat forces' participation in wars ==
War in the context of this list is broadly construed to be a direct armed conflict between organized Israeli military forces and organized forces of (a) belligerent(s).

(Note: Ongoing wars are indicated in bold and with red bars.)

Rank	War	Dates	Duration	Duration (graphical representation)
1	South Lebanon conflict	1982 – 2000	17.7 years (17 years, 7 months)	
2	First Intifada	1987 – 1993	5.8 years (5 years, 9 months)	
3	Second Intifada	2000 – 2005	4.4 years (4 years, 4 months)	
4	War of Attrition	1967 – 1970	3.1 years (3 years, 1 month)	
5	**Middle Eastern crisis** (Note: Including Gaza war (2023–present), Hezbollah–Israel conflict (2023–present, which includes ground invasions in 2024 and 2026–present), Israeli invasion of Syria (2024, with some skirmishes continuing related to the Southern Syria conflict (2025–present)), Twelve-Day War (2025), and 2026 Iran war (2026–present))	2023 – present	3.1 years (3 years, 1 month)	
6	1948 Palestine war	1947 – 1949	1.6 years (1 year, 7 months)	
7	1982 Lebanon War	1982 – 1982	115 days	
8	2014 Gaza War	2014 – 2014	49 days	
9	2006 Lebanon War	2006 – 2006	33 days	
10	First Gaza War	2008 – 2009	22 days	
11	Yom Kippur War	1973 – 1973	19 days	
12	2021 Israel–Palestine crisis	2021 – 2021	15 days	
13	Suez Crisis	1956 – 1956	9 days	
14	1978 South Lebanon conflict	1978 – 1978	7 days	
14	2012 Gaza War	2012 – 2012	7 days	
16	Six-Day War	1967 – 1967	5 days	

== See also ==
- History of the Israel Defense Forces
- History of the Israeli Air Force
- Iran–Israel proxy conflict
- Israeli casualties of war
- Jewish military history
- List of modern conflicts in the Middle East
- List of wars involving the State of Palestine
- Outline of the Gaza war
- Timeline of Israeli history
- History of the Arab–Israeli conflict
- Violent conflicts involving the Yishuv

== Bibliography ==
- Morris, Benny (25 May 2011). Righteous Victims: A History of the Zionist-Arab Conflict, 1881-2001. Knopf Doubleday Publishing Group. ISBN 978-0-307-78805-4.
- O'Ballance, Edgar (1979). No Victor, No Vanquished: The Yom Kippur War (1979 ed.). Barrie & Jenkins. pp. 28–370. ISBN 978-0-214-20670-2.
- Oren, Michael B. (2002). Six Days of War: June 1967 and the Making of the Modern Middle East. Oxford University Press. ISBN 978-0-19-515174-9.
- Rabinovich, Abraham (2004). The Yom Kippur War: The Epic Encounter That Transformed the Middle East. New York: Schocken Books. ISBN 978-0-8052-4176-1.
- Shazly, Lieutenant General Saad el (2003). The Crossing of the Suez, Revised Edition (revised ed.). American Mideast Research. ISBN 978-0-9604562-2-2.
