= List of wars involving Palestine =

This is a list of wars involving Palestine.

== Wars and other conflicts ==
Conflict	Combatant 1	Combatant 2	Results
First Intifada (1987–1993)	Al-Qiyada al-Muwhhada; Fatah; Popular Front for the Liberation of Palestine; Democratic Front for the Liberation of Palestine; Palestinian Communist Party; Hamas; Palestinian Islamic Jihad	Israel	Uprising suppressed: Madrid Conference (1991); Oslo I Accord (1993); Israel–PLO Letters of Mutual Recognition; Establishment of the Palestinian National Authority; Creation of the West Bank "Areas" by the Oslo II Accord in 1995
Second Intifada (2000–2005)	Palestinian Authority; PLO; Fatah; Popular Front for the Liberation of Palestine; Democratic Front for the Liberation of Palestine; Hamas; Palestinian Islamic Jihad; Popular Resistance Committees	Israel	Uprising suppressed: Israeli forces withdraw from the Gaza Strip; Israel initiates the Gaza disengagement plan; Israel constructs the West Bank barrier
2006 Gaza–Israel conflict (2006)	Palestine; Fatah; Hamas; (Palestinian Islamic Jihad) Islamic Jihad	Israel	Israeli military victory: End of Hamas rocketfire into Israel until May 2007 (though continued attacks by other groups); Palestinian Authority forces deploy to stop rocket launches until June 2007.
Battle of Gaza (2007)	Fatah; Palestinian Authority; Support: United States (alleged by Hamas)	Hamas	Hamas victory: Hamas takeover of the Gaza Strip
Gaza War (2008–2009)	Gaza Strip; Hamas; (Hamas) Ezzedeen al-Qassam Brigades; Popular Front for the Liberation of Palestine; (Popular Front for the Liberation of Palestine) Abu Ali Mustapha Brigades; Islamic Jihad Movement in Palestine; (Palestinian Islamic Jihad) Al-Quds Brigades; Al-Aqsa Martyrs' Brigades; Popular Resistance Committees	Israel; Israel Defense Forces; Israel Security Agency	Defeat: IDF declared unilateral ceasefire, 12 hours later Hamas announced a one-week ceasefire.; Humanitarian crisis and deterioration of infrastructure and basic services in Gaza.; Temporary reduction in the number of rockets being fired from the Gaza Strip.; See results
2012 Gaza War (2012)	Gaza Strip; Hamas; (Hamas) Al-Qassam Brigades; Palestinian Islamic Jihad; Popular Front for the Liberation of Palestine–General Command; Popular Front for the Liberation of Palestine; Democratic Front for the Liberation of Palestine; Popular Resistance Committees; Al-Aqsa Martyrs' Brigades; Jaysh al-Ummah	Israel	Ceasefire: Both sides claim victory; According to Israel, the operation "severely impaired Hamas's launching capabilities."; According to Hamas, their rocket strikes led to the ceasefire deal; Cessation of rocket fire into Israel; Gaza fishermen allowed 6 nmi (11 km) out to sea for fishing; reduced back to 3 nmi (6 km) after 22 March 2013
2014 Gaza War (2014)	Gaza Strip; Hamas; Palestinian Islamic Jihad; Democratic Front for the Liberation of Palestine; Popular Front for the Liberation of Palestine; Popular Resistance Committees; Al-Aqsa Martyrs' Brigades; Abdullah Azzam Brigades; Jaysh al-Ummah	Israel	Inconclusive: According to Israel, Hamas was severely weakened and achieved none of its demands; According to Hamas, Israel was repelled from Gaza
2021 Israel–Palestine crisis (2021)	Gaza Strip; Hamas; Palestinian Islamic Jihad; Popular Front for the Liberation of Palestine; Al-Aqsa Martyrs' Brigades; Smaller militant groups (Note: Besides Hamas and the Palestinian Islamic Jihad, FDD's Long War Journal identified the following militant groups as having fought in the 2021 conflict: Jihad Jibril Brigades, Humat al-Aqsa, Jaysh al-Ummah, Katibat al-Sheikh al-Emireen, Mujahideen Brigades, Abdul al-Qadir al-Husseini Brigades, and two al-Aqsa Martyrs Brigades splinter factions.); Protesters in Israel and Palestine: Arab Israeli protesters; Palestinian protesters in the West Bank and Jerusalem; Jordanian, Lebanese, and Syrian protesters (see international)	Israel; Israel Defense Forces; Israeli Air Force; Israel Police; Israel Border Police; Shin Bet; Jewish Israeli protesters	Ceasefire: Return to status quo ante bellum; ceasefire went into effect; Victory claimed by both sides; Halting of both Israeli airstrikes inside the Gaza Strip and Palestinian rocket fire into Israel
Gaza war (2023–present)	Hamas Palestinian allies: Palestinian Islamic Jihad Popular Front for the Liberation of Palestine Democratic Front for the Liberation of Palestine Al-Aqsa Martyrs' Brigades Palestinian Mujahideen Movement Palestinian Freedom Movement Popular Resistance Committees Popular Front for the Liberation of Palestine – General Command; (Palestine) Abdul al-Qadir al-Husseini Brigades Jaysh al-Ummah	Israel (Note: See List of military aid to Israel during the Gaza war and American involvement) Allies: Popular Forces (Note: Popular Forces have been described as a Salafi Jihadist organisation with alleged ties to the Islamic State. Several senior leaders in the Popular Forces also allied with the Islamic State in the Sinai.) (Note: From May 2024)	Ongoing: Gaza genocide

== See also ==
- List of wars involving Israel
- List of modern conflicts in the Middle East
- Palestinian casualties of war
