= List of al-Qaeda attacks against Israel =

List of terrorist attacks by Al-Qaeda targeting Israel

This is list of terrorist attacks and foiled plots attributed to the militant organization Al-Qaeda and its regional affiliates directed against the State of Israel or Israeli and Jewish interests abroad. Historically, Al-Qaeda focused on the "far enemy" (the United States and the West). However, the organization has frequently targeted Israel as part of its ideological narrative. While Israel's security services have prevented many domestic attacks, Al-Qaeda has successfully struck Israeli and Jewish targets in Africa, Europe, and the Middle East.

== Successful attacks ==
Date	Event	Location	Al-Qaeda branch/affiliate group	Description	Casualties
April 11, 2002	Ghriba synagogue bombing	Djerba, Tunisia	(al-Qaeda) Al-Qaeda	A truck bomb was detonated outside an ancient synagogue, killing 19 people, mostly German and French tourists. AQ claimed it was a response to Israeli actions in the West Bank via its spokesperson, Sulaiman Abu Ghaith.	19 killed
Nov 28, 2002	Mombasa Hotel Bombing	Mombasa, Kenya	(al-Qaeda) Al-Qaeda	An Al-Qaeda cell launched a simultaneous attack targeting Israelis in Kenya. A car bomb hit the Israeli-owned Paradise Hotel, killing 13. Simultaneously, two Strela-2 missiles were fired at an Arkia Israeli Airlines Boeing 757 (both missed).	13 killed (3 Israelis)
April 30, 2003	Mike's Place suicide bombing	Tel Aviv, Israel	(Hamas) Hamas; Al-Aqsa Martyrs' Brigades (al-Qaeda) Al-Qaeda-linked networks	The Mike's Place suicide bombing was a suicide bombing, perpetrated by British nationals, at Mike's Place, a bar in Tel Aviv, Israel, on April 30, 2003, killing three civilians and wounding 50. While carried out in coordination with Hamas, intelligence reports later identified the bombers' logistical and ideological training within Al-Qaeda-linked networks in the United Kingdom.	3 Israeli civilians killed (+ 1 bomber killed)
May 16, 2003	Casablanca Bombings	Casablanca, Morocco	Salafia Jihadia	While targeting several locations, a cell of 12 suicide bombers belonging to a Salafia Jihadia specifically targeted a Jewish community center (Alliance Israélite center) and Jewish-owned businesses (including a restaurant). Al-Qaeda central is believed to have inspired or directed the operation.	33 killed
Nov 15, 2003	Istanbul Synagogue Bombings	Istanbul, Turkey	(al-Qaeda) Al-Qaeda's Turkish cell İBDA-C	Two truck bombs were detonated outside the Neve Shalom and Bet Israel synagogues in Istanbul, killing 28 people. Al-Qaeda later claimed the operation through its Turkish cell.	28 killed (6 Jews)
Oct 7, 2004	Sinai Peninsula Bombings	Sinai, Egypt	(al-Qaeda) Tawhid wal-Jihad in Egypt	The Taba Hilton and two campsites in Ras al-Shitan were simultaneously bombed, killing 34 people (including 12 Israelis). The group "Tawhid wal-Jihad in Egypt" claimed it as a response to Al-Qaeda's call.	34 killed (12 Israelis)
July 23, 2005	Sharm el-Sheikh Bombings	Sharm el-Sheikh, Egypt	Abdullah Azzam Brigades	Multiple blasts targeting hotels and markets frequented by international and Israeli tourists. Responsibility was claimed by the Abdullah Azzam Brigades, an Al-Qaeda affiliate.	88 killed (1 Israeli)
Aug 19, 2005	Eilat rocket attack	(Jordan) Aqaba, Jordan; Eilat, Israel	Al-Qaeda in Iraq; Abdullah Azzam Brigades	In 2005 several Katyusha rockets were fired from within Jordan. Some hit near the Eilat airport in Israel and two hit very close to two United States Navy ships docked in Aqaba, Jordan - USS Kearsarge, a Wasp-class amphibious assault ship, and USS Ashland, a Whidbey Island-class dock landing ship. One of the rockets hit a Jordanian military hospital, killing a Jordanian soldier. The attack is regarded as having been perpetrated by the al-Zarqawi branch of Al Qaeda (Al-Qaeda in Iraq), and the Al-Qaeda-affiliated group, Abdullah Azzam Brigades, claimed responsibility.	1 Jordanian soldier killed
Nov 9, 2005	Amman Hotel Bombings	Amman, Jordan	Al-Qaeda in Iraq	Hotels frequented by Israeli and American visitors were bombed. Targets included the Radisson SAS, where an Israeli wedding party was reportedly staying. The attack was carried out by Al-Qaeda in Iraq under Abu Musab al-Zarqawi.	60 killed (2 Israelis)
June 25, 2006	2006 Gaza cross-border raid	(Palestine) Gaza Strip; Kerem Shalom Crossing, Israel	(Hamas) Hamas; Popular Resistance Committees; Fatah; Islamic Jihad; Jaysh al-Islam	Jaysh al-Islam, an Al-Qaeda-affiliated group in the Gaza Strip participated in the 2006 Gaza cross-border raid, in which seven or eight Gazan Palestinian militants attacked Israel Defense Forces (IDF) positions near the Kerem Shalom Crossing through an attack tunnel. In the attack, two IDF soldiers and two Palestinian militants were killed, four IDF soldiers were wounded, one of whom was Gilad Shalit, who was captured and taken to the Gaza Strip.	2 Palestinian militants killed, 2 IDF soldiers killed, and 4 IDF soldiers injured.
June 9, 2009	Karni border crossing clashes	(Palestine) Gaza Strip; Israel - Karni crossing	Jund Ansar Allah	Jund Ansar Allah, an Al-Qaeda-affiliated group in Gaza Strip, carried out a raid on the Karni border crossing between the Gaza Strip and Israel. Ten individuals from the group rode into battle on horses laden with large quantities of explosives, with at least three of them being shot dead by Israeli troops. Five Jund Ansar Allah operatives in total died in the operation. Israeli officials said several of the men had been wearing explosive belts, and suspected they had been attempting to kidnap a soldier.	5 Gazan militants killed
Sep 11, 2009	Nahariya rocket attack	(Lebanon) Lebanon; Nahariya, Israel	Ziad al-Jarrah Division of the Abdullah Azzam Brigades	Two Katyusha rockets were fired from Lebanon towards Nahariya, Israel. Ziad al-Jarrah Division of the Abdullah Azzam Brigades issued the following statement on its website: "Your brothers launched two Katyusha rockets from southern Lebanon, which landed in the settlement of Nahariya in occupied northern Palestine". In its statement, the organization clarified that it was part of al-Qaeda and that it carried out the act in protest of the Israeli blockade of the Gaza Strip and the prevention of believers from praying at the Al-Aqsa Mosque in East Jerusalem.	No reported deaths
Aug 18, 2011	2011 southern Israel cross-border attacks	(Egypt) Sinai Peninsula, Egypt; Near the Ein Netafim spring, on Highway 12, Southern Israel	Ansar Bait al-Maqdis (claimed responsibility); Popular Resistance Committees (claimed by Israel; denied by the group)	On August 18, 2011, a series of cross-border attacks with parallel attacks and mutual cover was carried out in southern Israel on Highway 12 near the Egyptian border by a squad of presumably twelve militants in four groups. The attacks occurred after Israel's interior security service Shin Bet had warned of an attack by militants in the region and Israeli troops had been stationed in the area. The militants first opened fire at an Egged No. 392 bus as it was traveling on Highway 12 in the Negev near Eilat. Several minutes later, a bomb was detonated next to an Israeli army patrol along Israel's border with Egypt. In a third attack, an anti-tank missile hit a private vehicle, killing four civilians. Eight Israelis – six civilians, one Yamam special unit police sniper and one Golani Brigade soldier—were killed in the multiple-stage attack. The Israel Defense Forces reported eight attackers killed, and Egyptian security forces reported killing another two. Five Egyptian soldiers were also killed. According to Egypt, they were killed by Israeli security forces chasing militants across the Egyptian border, while an Israeli military officer initially said they were killed by a suicide bomber who had fled across the border into Egypt.	23 killed (6 Israeli civilians, 1 Israeli soldier, 1 Israeli Yamam policeman, 5 Egyptian soldiers, 10 attackers)
Sep 21, 2012	September 2012 southern Israel cross-border attack	Southern Israel near Mount Harif	Ansar Bait al-Maqdis	Three Egyptian militants, wearing civilian clothes and armed with explosive belts, AK-47 rifles and RPG launchers, approached the Egypt-Israel border in an area where the Egypt–Israel barrier was incomplete, and opened fire on a group of IDF soldiers supervising the civilian workers who were constructing the border fence. The militants opened fire on a small group of IDF soldiers, shooting from a distance of about 100 meters. During the incident, which was thwarted at a relatively early stage by the IDF forces, one Israeli soldier was killed and another moderately wounded. Both of the soldiers were graduates of Hesder yeshivas. The three militants were killed in the ensuing gunfight; one was killed by a female soldier from the mixed-gender Caracal Battalion. The jihadist militant group Ansar Bait al-Maqdis, an al-Qaeda-inspired militant organization based in the Sinai Peninsula, claimed responsibility for the attack.	4 killed (1 Israeli soldier and 3 Egyptian militants)
Nov 14-21 2012	2012 Gaza War	(Palestine) Gaza Strip; Israel	Jaysh al-Ummah	Jaysh al-Ummah, an Al-Qaeda-affiliated group in the Gaza Strip participated in the 2012 Gaza War against Israel.	Unknown
Jan 20, 2014	Eilat Rocket Attack	(Egypt) Sinai Peninsula, Egypt; Eilat, Israel	Ansar Bait al-Maqdis	Ansar Bait al-Maqdis, an Al-Qaeda-affiliated group in Sinai, fired two Grad rockets at Eilat. No damage or injuries were reported.	No reported deaths
Jan 31, 2014	Eilat Rocket Attack	(Egypt) Sinai Peninsula, Egypt; Eilat, Israel	Ansar Bait al-Maqdis	Ansar Bait al-Maqdis, an Al-Qaeda-affiliated group in Sinai, launched a rocket from the Sinai Peninsula aimed at Eilat, Israel. The Iron Dome system intercepted the rocket.	No reported deaths
July 2014	Rocket attacks during 2014 Gaza War	(Palestine) Gaza Strip; Israel	Saraya Yehya Ayyash group of Abdullah Azzam Brigades	Saraya Yehya Ayyash group, which is part of the Al-Qaeda affiliated Abdullah Azzam Brigades, posted pictures and video of itself on social media, which showed the members of the group launching rockets from Gaza into Israel during 2014 Gaza War.	Unknown
July 8–26 August 2014	2014 Gaza War	(Palestine) Gaza Strip; Israel	Jaysh al-Ummah	Jaysh al-Ummah, an Al-Qaeda-affiliated group in the Gaza Strip participated in the 2014 Gaza War against Israel.	Unknown
Aug 28, 2014	Beheading of alleged Mossad agents	Sinai Peninsula, Egypt	Ansar Bait al-Maqdis	Ansar Bait al-Maqdis, an Al-Qaeda-affiliated group in Sinai, released a video showing the beheading of 4 Egyptians accused of being Mossad spies and providing Israel with intelligence.	4 killed (alleged Mossad agents)
Nov 12 2019	Kfar Aza & Shaar Hanegev Rocket Attack	(Palestine) Gaza Strip; Kfar Aza & the Shaar Hanegev Regional Council, Israel	Jaysh al-Ummah	Jaysh al-Ummah, an Al-Qaeda-affiliated group in the Gaza Strip claimed responsibility for rocket fire against Kfar Aza and the Shaar Hanegev Regional Council.	
May 6–21, 2021	2021 Israel–Palestine crisis	(Palestine) Gaza Strip; Israel	Jaysh al-Ummah	Jaysh al-Ummah, an Al-Qaeda-affiliated group in the Gaza Strip claimed to have taken part in the 2021 Israel–Palestine crisis, shooting rockets at Israeli targets.	Unknown
Oct 7, 2023	October 7 attacks	Sufa, Israel	Jaysh al-Ummah	It is believed that militants of Jaysh al-Ummah, an Al-Qaeda-affiliated group based in Gaza, participated in the attack on kibbutz Sufa in Israel as part of October 7 attacks.	Unknown
October - December 2023	Gaza War	(Palestine) Gaza Strip; Israel	Jaysh al-Ummah	Jaysh al-Ummah, an Al-Qaeda-affiliated group in the Gaza Strip published a statement on Dec. 8 saying its fighters have attacked Israel Defense Forces (IDF) troops operating in the Gaza Strip. The statement alleges that IDF positions, along with Israeli communities near the Gaza border, were targeted with rockets and heavy-caliber mortar shells by “artillery units.” Jaysh al-Ummah further claims that during the initial phase of the IDF's ground incursion in northern Gaza, its fighters engaged Israeli forces using improvised explosive devices, anti-tank weaponry, and machine guns, leading to casualties among Israeli troops. Furthermore, in an encounter with Israeli forces in the Sheikh Radwan neighborhood of Gaza City, a member of the group identified as Ahmed Saleh Hamid was killed. The statement alleges Hamid is the nephew of Jaysh al-Ummah's Emir, Abu Hafs al-Maqdisi.	1 Gaza militant killed and allegedly several Israeli casualties.
Sept 15, 2024	Grad Rocket Attack	(Palestine) Gaza Strip; Israel	Huras al-Masra	In September 2024, Huras al-Masra (Guardians of the Journey), an Al-Qaeda-affiliate group in Gaza, claimed a rocket attack targeting Israeli communities near the Gaza border.	No reported deaths

== Foiled and thwarted plots ==
Date	Event	Location	Al-Qaeda branch/affiliate group	Description
2000	Sydney Olympics Plot	Sydney, Australia	(al-Qaeda) Al-Qaeda	Australian intelligence disrupted a cell planning to attack Israeli athletes and sites during the Summer Games.
2001	Richard Reid Reconnaissance	Ben Gurion Airport, Israel	(al-Qaeda) Al-Qaeda	Before his "shoe bomb" attempt, Richard Reid scouted El Al security at Ben Gurion Airport for Al-Qaeda.
2002	Tel Aviv Nightclub Plot	Tel Aviv, Israel	(al-Qaeda) Al-Qaeda	A major plot to conduct simultaneous suicide bombings at multiple Tel Aviv nightclubs was thwarted by Mossad/CIA coordination.
July 2010	Suspected al-Qaeda biological weapons expert arrest	Israel	(al-Qaeda) Al-Qaeda	In November 2013 it was revealed that Israel had been holding a suspected al-Qaeda biological weapons expert since 2010. A military court placed Samir Abdul Latif al-Baraq in "administrative detention", which allows indefinite detention without charge or trial, after he was arrested in July 2010.
October 2010	The "Cargo Plane" Plot	Chicago, United States	Al-Qaeda in the Arabian Peninsula	In October 2010, Al-Qaeda in the Arabian Peninsula (AQAP) sent explosive packages hidden in printer cartridges. They were addressed to Jewish synagogues in Chicago. The group accused the Saudi authorities of thwarting the attack and of "collaboration with the Jews". AQAP explicitly stated the motive was the "Zionist-Crusader" alliance and retaliation for Gaza.
August 9, 2013	Sinai Rocket Attack	(Egypt) Rafah, Egypt; Israel	Ansar Bait al-Maqdis	Al-Qaeda-affiliated in Sinai, Ansar Bayt al-Maqdis, issued a statement in which it claimed that it was the target of an Israeli bombing that allegedly took place in the Egyptian Rafah, and that four of its fighters were killed in the attack. According to the organization, at the time of the attack, its operatives were preparing to fire a rocket at Israel.
2014	East Jerusalem / US Embassy Plot	Tel Aviv; Jerusalem, Israel	(al-Qaeda) Al-Qaeda	The Shin Bet arrested a three-man cell recruited by an Al-Qaeda operative in Gaza. They planned suicide bombings at the US Embassy in Tel Aviv and a Jerusalem convention center.
2014	Al-Nusra Golan infiltration attempt	(Syria) Quneitra, Syria; Golan Heights, Israel	(al-Nusra Front) Al-Nusra Front	Israel intercepted communications regarding an "infiltration attack" planned by Al-Nusra Front militants in Syria. The plot involved a cross-border raid from the Golan Heights to seize a kibbutz and take hostages. The attack was reportedly personally approved by Abu Mohammad al-Julani.
November 2020	Assassination of Abdullah Ahmed Abdullah	Iran	(al-Qaeda) Al-Qaeda	In November 2020, Israeli agents assassinated Al-Qaeda's next alleged number two leader, Abdullah Ahmed Abdullah whose pseudonym was Abu Muhammad Al-Masri. He was involved in the 1998 bombings of the U.S. embassies in Kenya and Tanzania.
2024	"Jerusalem will never be Judaized" Campaign	(Europe) Europe; United States	(al-Qaeda) Al-Qaeda	Following Al-Qaeda's 2019–2024 ideological campaign, several plots targeting Israeli embassies in Europe and the US were foiled by local authorities.

== See also ==
- Terrorism in Israel
- Antisemitism in Islam
- Timeline of al-Qaeda attacks
