= PHM =

PHM may refer to:

- PulteGroup, NYSE stock symbol
- Penn-Harris-Madison School Corporation, Indiana, US
- A US Navy hull classification symbol: Patrol missile hydrofoil (PHM)
- Proto-Hmong–Mien language
- PHM Racing, a German auto racing team

== Science ==
- Master of Philosophy (M.Phil. or Ph.M.)
- Prognostics and health management
- Pure homopolar motor, is an electric motor not requiring brushes, electronics, or semiconductor parts to convert direct current into torque.
- Passive hydrogen maser, a type of atomic clock

== Media ==
- Pretty Hate Machine, the 1989 debut album from Nine Inch Nails
- Project Hail Mary, a 2021 book by Andy Weir
  - Project Hail Mary (film), its 2026 film adaptation
