= Impact of the Gaza War (2008–2009) =

Consequences of Gaza War (2008-2009)

There are multiple humanitarian, medical, economic, and industrial effects of the 2008–2009 Gaza War which started with the Israeli air strikes on 27 December 2008 and ended on 18 January with a cease-fire implemented unilaterally by Israel, and later the same day by Hamas and other Palestinian factions.

The cease-fire followed twenty-two days of bombardment by land, sea and air which left over 1,300 Palestinians dead and over 5,000 injured, and the death of 13 Israelis. The United Nations Development Programme warned that there will be long-term consequences of the attacks on Gaza because the livelihoods and assets of tens of thousands of Gaza civilians had been affected.

== Gaza humanitarian crisis ==
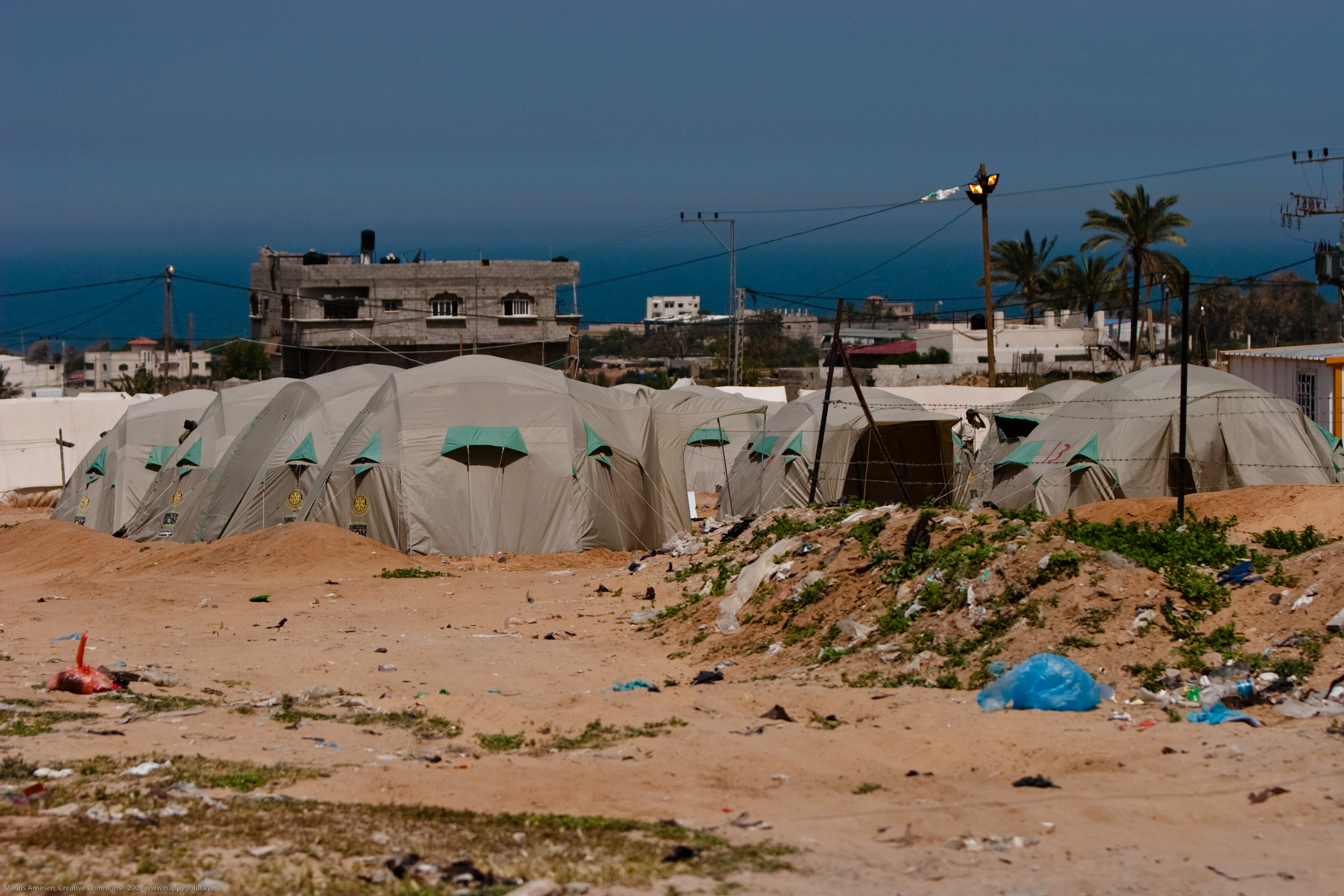
Tent camp, Gaza Strip, April 2009

The United Nations Office for the Coordination of Humanitarian Affairs states that the Gaza strip humanitarian crisis is significant and should not be understated. The UN stated in 2009 that the situation in the Gaza Strip was a "human dignity crisis," entailing "a massive destruction of livelihoods and a significant deterioration of infrastructure and basic services." Fear and panic were widespread, with 80 percent of the population unable to support themselves and dependent on humanitarian assistance. The International Red Cross said the situation was "intolerable" and a "full blown humanitarian crisis."

On 3 January, prior to the IDF ground operation, Israel's foreign minister Tzipi Livni stated that Israel had taken care to protect the civilian population of Gaza, and that it had kept the humanitarian situation "completely as it should be", maintaining Israel's earlier stance. The head of the Arab League, Amr Moussa, criticised Livni for the statement and further criticised the Security Council for not responding faster to the crisis. On subsequent reports, the UN stated that "only an immediate cease-fire will be able to address the large-scale humanitarian and protection crisis that faces the people of Gaza."

=== Shelter ===
==== Protection and displacement ====
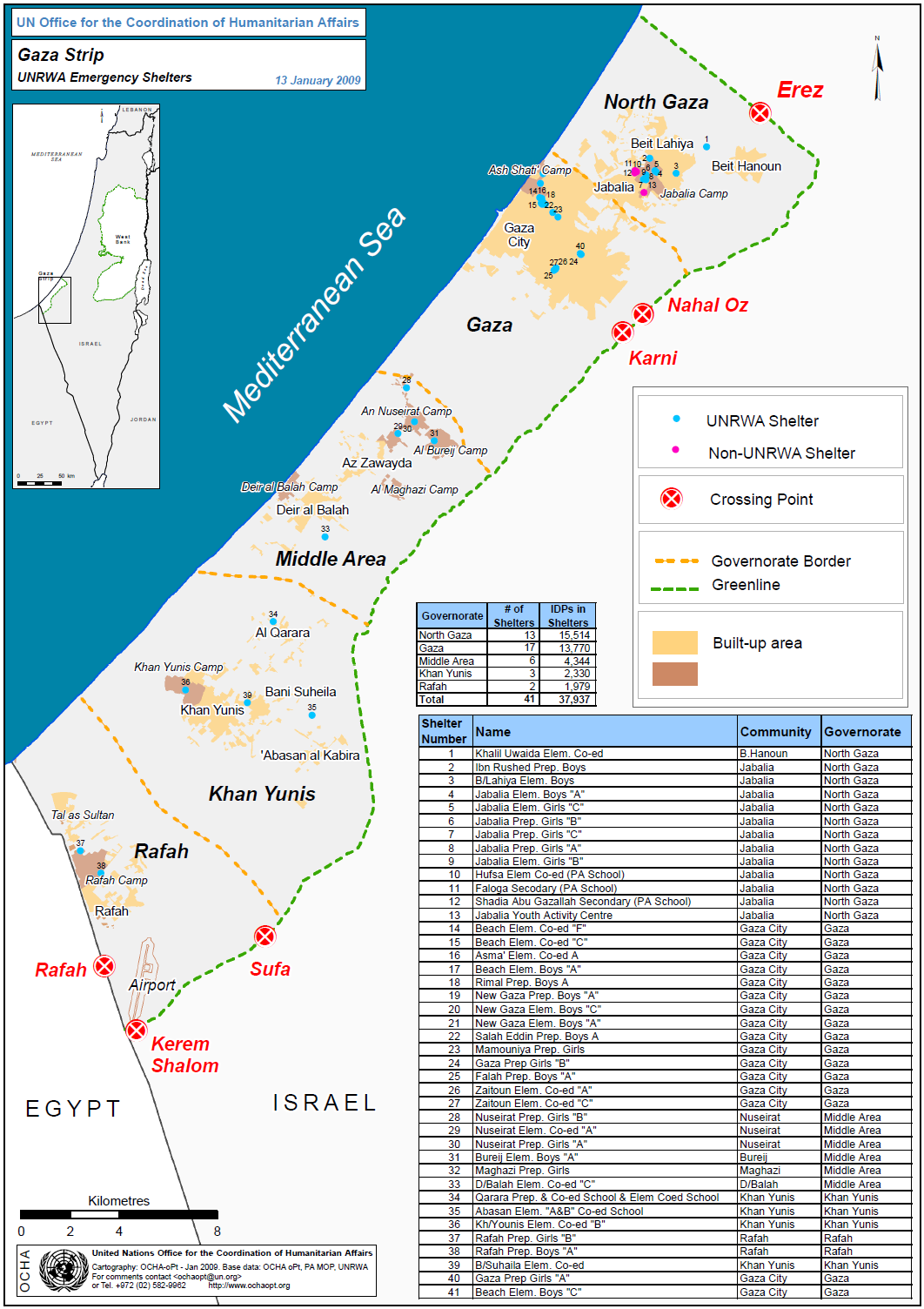
Map of Gaza Strip indicating location of 41 emergency shelters set up by UNRWA (as of 13 January) to house 37,937 Internally displaced Palestinians

The UN described the situation as a "critical protection crisis". The entire civilian population in the Gaza strip remains vulnerable, the UN reported, with no safe haven, no bomb shelters and with closed borders, making it one of the rare conflicts where civilians have no place to flee. There is a sense of "panic, fear and distress" throughout the whole strip. Civilians have implemented a self-imposed curfew since no public warning systems or effective shelters exist. People have been evacuating their homes and staying in streets for long hours exposed to further danger, or staying with relatives. Civilians face insecurities while re-stocking basic food items, water and cooking gas. Children, 56% of the population, have no outlets and they remain "dangerously exposed" to the fighting around them.

The Palestinian Red Crescent estimates that thousands of homes have been damaged and it became "increasingly difficult" for their residents to stay in them due to the cold weather. The UNRWA has prepared its schools to act as temporary shelters for displaced persons. As reported by both the Save the Children Alliance and the Al Mezan Center, prior to the IDF ground operation on 3 January, more than 13,000 people (2000 families) have been displaced in the strip. The majority of those families seek shelter with relatives while others are staying at the temporary emergency shelters provided by the UNRWA. As of the thirteenth of day the Israeli military operation, 21,200 displaced Palestinian people were staying at these shelters. By the third week of the attacks, this number has increased by 14,300 refugees, reaching 35,520 Palestinians staying under the UNRWA shelters. In the same period, Al Mezan Center also estimated that a total of 80,000-90,000 Palestinians have been displaced, including up to 50,000 children. As the numbers of displaced refugees constantly increased the UNRWA had to open new emergency shelters throughout the Gaza strip. The shelters were overcrowded and were sheltering double their originally planned capacities.

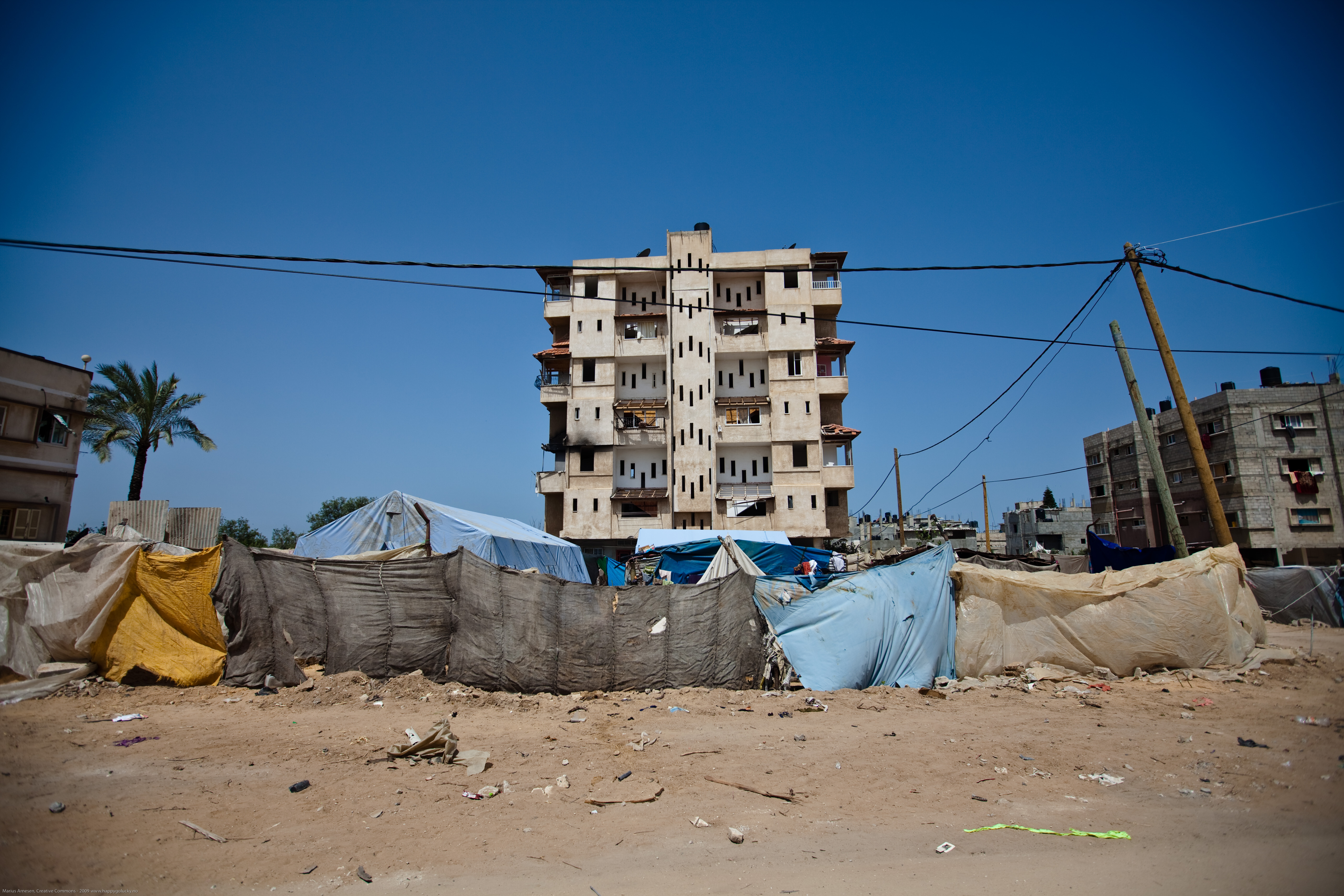
Tent camp, Gaza Strip, April 2009

By 18 January, the number of Palestinians seeking the UNRWA shelters has peaked to around 51,000 displaced people, with only basic level of support due to the unprecedented number of refugees. After the unilateral lull, displaced persons began moving from the emergency centers. As of 23 January, UNRWA was still operating 15 emergency centers while aiming to close those shelters as soon as possible so that they can reopen the schools. As of 9 February, three non-school UNRWA shelters remain open, hosting 388 displaced people. Thousands of Gazans remain homeless.

After the end of the Israeli operation and moving from the emergency shelters, many Palestinians (preliminary assessments shows 10,991 displaced households, or 71,657 people) have been homeless and remain with host families due to the extensive attacks. The host families are overstretched and face shortages of food, non-food items, water and electricity. Priority needs for those families include kitchen sets, hygiene kits, blankets, mattresses and plastic sheeting.

One year after the ceasefire approximately 20,000 people remained displaced.

==== Buildings destruction ====
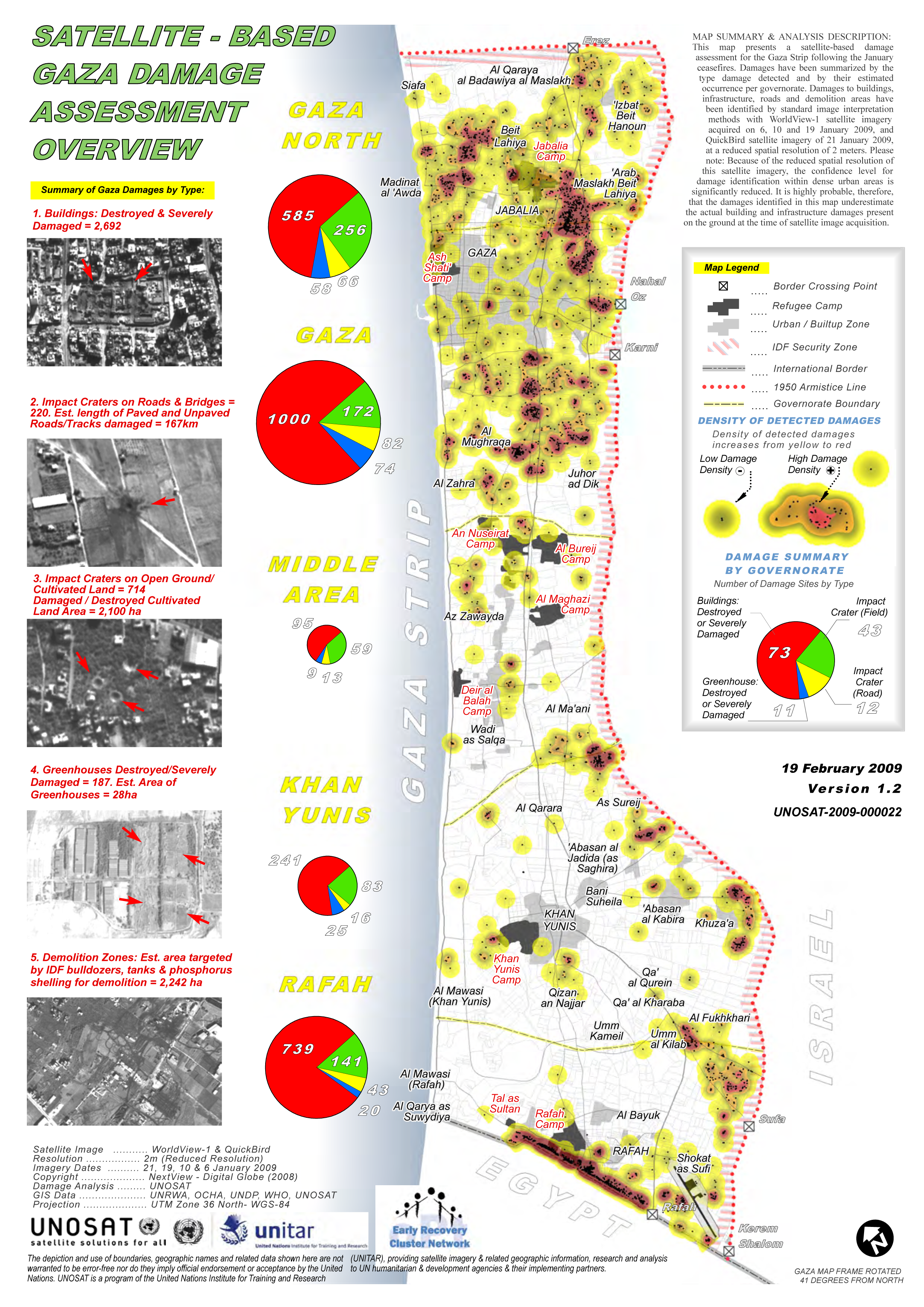
A satellite-based damage assessment of the Gaza Strip by the United Nations (UNOSAT). February 2009

Aid agencies have reported that Gaza "looks like earthquake zone": widespread destruction of houses, infrastructure, roads, greenhouses, cemeteries, mosques and schools are reported in Jabalia, Tal Al Hawa, Beit Hanoun, and Beit Lahia in the northern Gaza Strip. According to the ICRC, "a number of areas, including parts of Beit Lahia looked like the aftermath of a strong earthquake". Meanwhile, Al Mezan Center field workers reported that "entire urban blocks have disappeared" in North Gaza and eastern of Gaza City. The International Red Cross reports that in Jabalia alone, between one and two thousand households are now living in the rubble of their houses. John Holmes, the Under-Secretary General of the United Nations, in his statement to the Security Council, reports that he saw an entire industrial and residential area in East Jabalia which had been "systematically bulldozed", an area of at least one square kilometer and that one of the best schools in Gaza is reduced to rubble 2,000 refugee families had their shelters totally destroyed. UNRWA was ready to provide cash assistance and shelter repair for those families, but has been unable to deliver this assistance to beneficiaries due to a shortage of liquidity and construction material in the Gaza Strip.

An initial survey conducted by the UNDP estimates that 14,000 homes, 68 government buildings, and 31 non-governmental organization offices (NGOs) were either totally or partially damaged. As a result, an estimated 600,000 tonnes of concrete rubble will need to be removed. Since 2007, construction material have not permitted entry into Gaza, adversely affecting UN projects, in particular UNRWA and UNDP which were forced to suspend more than $100 million in construction projects due to lack of materials. Another UNDP rapid damage assessment of 170 out of the 407 government and private schools in the Gaza strip found that ten schools were severely damaged, and that 160 government and ten private schools were partially damaged during the Israeli military operation. Eight kindergartens were severely damaged and 60 were partially damaged. The UN humanitarian office stated that repairing such schools remains an urgent priority. Ten UNICEF tents were brought to Gaza to be used as learning spaces in the most damage-stricken areas. The Israeli Coordinator of Government Activities in the Territories has confirmed that there is as yet no intention to revise the policy prohibiting clearance of reconstruction materials which would enable aid agencies in Gaza to transition to rehabilitation and reconstruction.

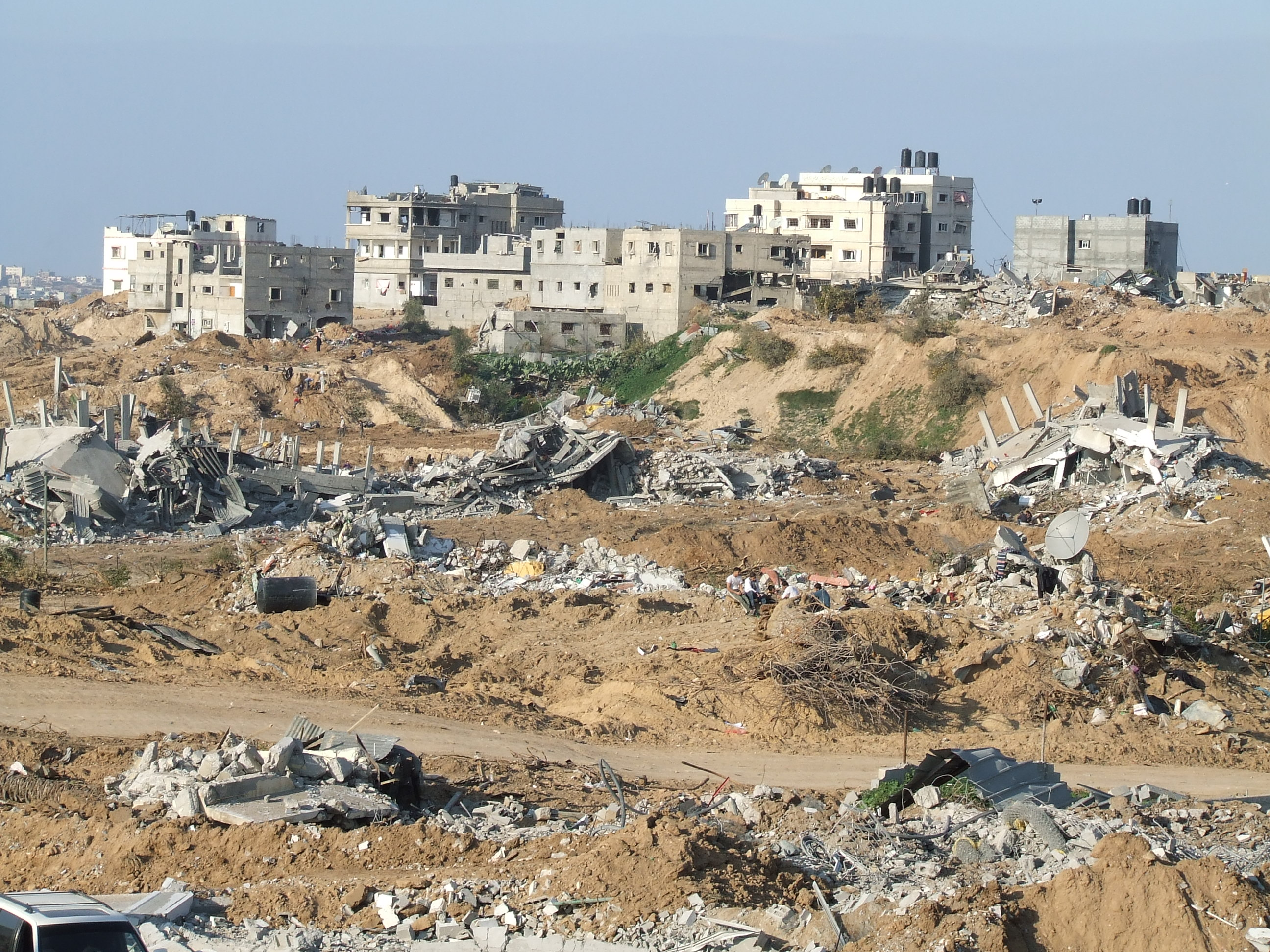
Damage in Jabalia, Gaza Strip

A satellite-based damage assessment of the Gaza Strip by the United Nations revealed 2,692 destroyed and severely damaged buildings, 220 impact craters on roads and bridges with an estimated length of 167 kilometres (104 mi) of paved and unpaved roads damaged, 714 impact craters on open ground or cultivated land with an estimated land area of 2,100 hectares (21 km^{2}), 187 greenhouses completely destroyed or severely damaged with an estimated area of 28 hectares (0.28 km^{2}), and 2,232 hectares (22.32 km^{2}) of demolished zones targeted by IDF bulldozers, tanks and phosphorus shelling.

Vandalization of Gazan homes by the Israeli defense forces has been reported: plastic bottles of urine and closed bags of excrement were left. There were also houses where excrement was smeared on the walls or in dry piles in corners. In many cases, Haaretz reports, smells indicates that soldiers had urinated on piles of clothing or inside a washing machine. In all the houses, the report continues, the toilets were overflowing and clogged, and there was "filth all around". The Associated Press reported that several homes had graffiti in Hebrew scribbled on the walls including "Death to the Arabs", "The eternal people have no fear", "Long live Jewish people" and other markings. On other incidents, an Israeli commander has reported that he has ordered his soldiers not to deface property and reprimanded anyone who did.

=== Health ===
==== Medical facilities and equipment ====
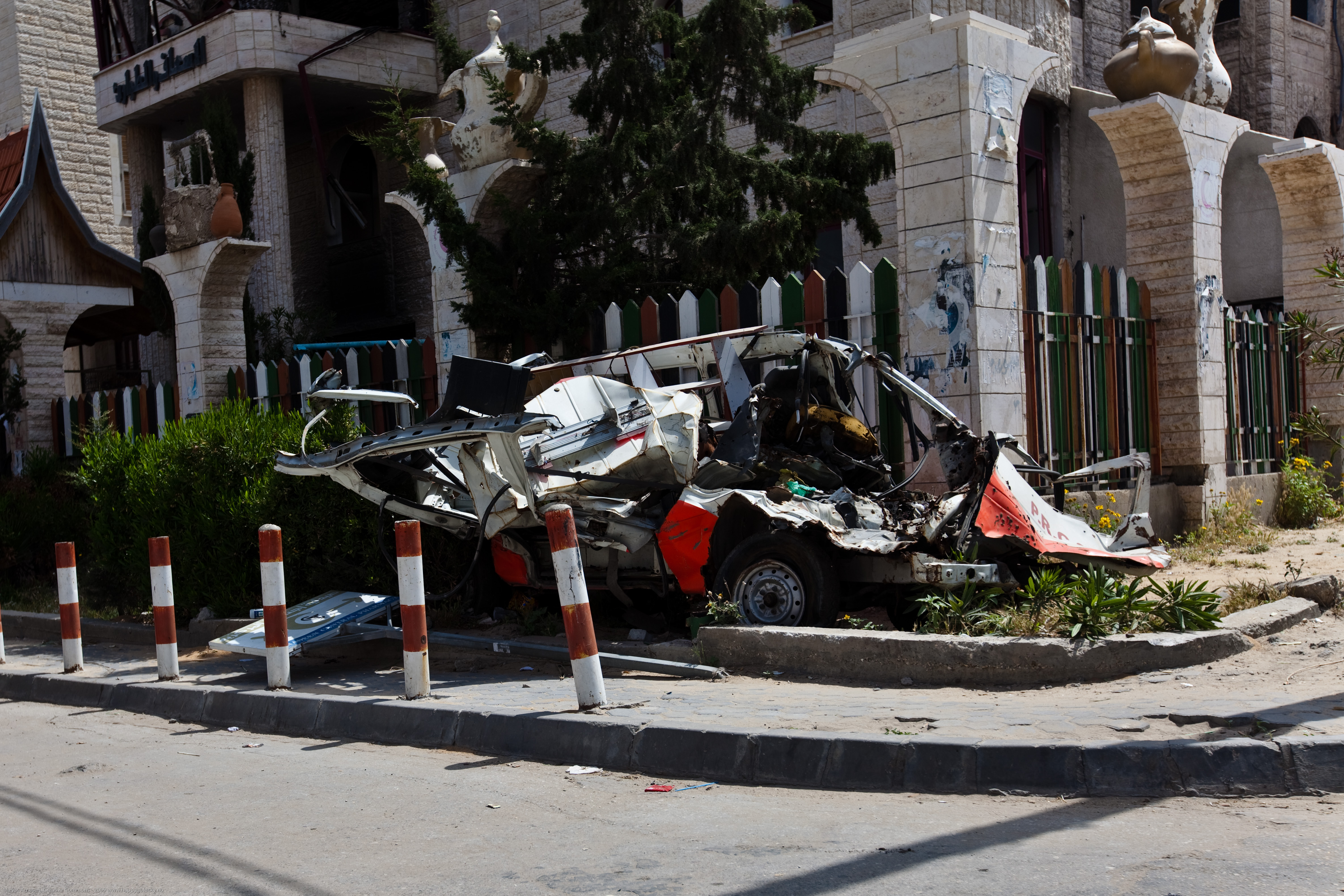
Ambulance destroyed in the conflict

Weakened by the eighteen-month Blockade of the Gaza Strip, as of 31 December the central drug store reported that 105 drugs and 255 medical supplies of the essential drug and supplies list are still unavailable, and approximately 20 percent of the ambulances were grounded due to lack of spare parts. Ambulances are experiencing difficulties in reaching the injured because of continuous fire. Hospitals reporting severe gas shortages expect total depletion in the coming days. As a result of shortages, the WFP distributed canned meat and high energy biscuits. The World Health Organization reported that at least 1,000 medical machines were out of order, with shortage of equipment and spare parts. Sources from the Gaza Health Ministry reported that the situation on 2 January, while extremely precarious, has stabilized after the arrival of medical supplies.

From 4 January, all of Gaza City hospitals were without main electricity, depending on back-up generators that were close to collapse. From 4 to 5 January, UNRWA was forced to shut down 19 health centers due to hostilities in the area, and Ministry of Health closed down generators at ambulance stations, vaccine stores, labs and warehouses due to the lack of fuel to run the generators until more was delivered. There existed an urgent need for strong pain killers, body gas, bed sheets for wrapping the dead, and for neuro-, vascular-, orthopedic- and open heart surgeons. Collateral damage to hospitals like broken glass was not being repaired. The Palestinian Red Cross was unable to respond to many calls due to the military operations. Only urgent cases and surgery is being carried out in hospitals and all out-patient clinics have been closed.

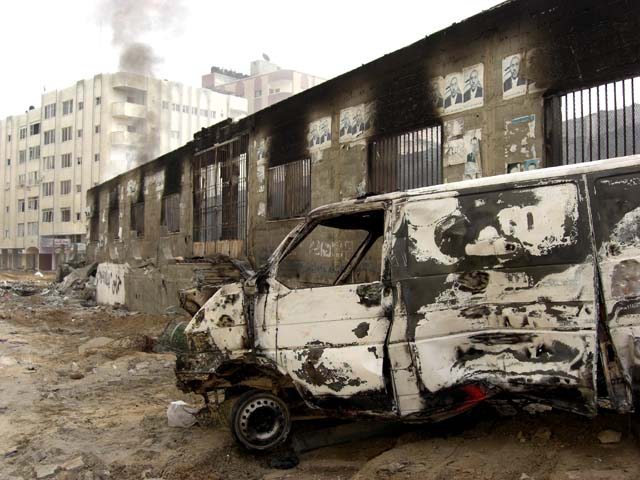
Al-Quds hospital, Gaza City, following Israeli shelling

Only three out of the 56 primary health care clinics are open; 70% of the chronic disease patients regularly attending those centers had to interrupt their treatment due to the security situation. Chronically ill patients who were accessing care outside of the Gaza strip prior to the conflict urgently needed to resume their treatment. Because of the Israeli closure of the Gaza strip, which has lasted more than a year and a half, hospitals are run down and much of the equipment is unreliable and in need for repair. The UN labeled the importance of spare parts for medical equipment as a priority.

By 2 February, most health facilities have resumed normal operation. Large volumes of medical supplies have been donated, but the most urgently needed equipment identified by the Palestinian Ministry of Health, notably pulse oximeters, defibrillators, infusion pumps, syringe pumps, ventilators, and anesthesia monitors, have still not been received. Psychotropic drugs are still lacking and urgently needed. In a damage assessment by the World Health Organization, 48% of the 122 health facilities assessed were found to be damaged or destroyed. 15 of Gaza's 27 hospitals and 41 primary health care centers has suffered damage. Two centers were destroyed, and 29 ambulances have been partially damaged or destroyed. The only rehabilitation center in Gaza has also suffered severe damage. Palestinian Ministry of Health reports 16 health staff were killed, and 22 injured while on duty.

The policy of the Government of Israel is to condition the access of Palestinians who live in the Palestinian territories to healthcare in Israel upon financial coverage from the Palestinian Authority. In January 2009, following the war, the Palestinian Authority cancelled financial coverage for all medical care for Palestinians in Israeli hospitals, including coverage for chronically ill Palestinian patients, and those in need of complex care that is not available in other tertiary medical centers in the region. This decision was protested by human rights organizations.

==== Population ====
The UNFPA warns about serious risks that faces more than 40,000 pregnant women in Gaza. Stress, trauma, and poor nutrition could result in life-threatening complications along with silent death and injuries for such population. Due to the lack of warm clothing or blankets among the increasing number of displaced people, shock and trauma, an alarming number of premature labour and delivery and the exposure of newborn infants to hypothermia are reported. The organization has also voiced concerns about neonatal care post-crisis as many women who delivered their babies in hospitals during the crisis were sent home as early as 30 minutes after giving birth. The World Health Organization warns of the risk of an outbreak of epidemic disease due to unrecovered bodies, many severely decomposed, and due to the sewage flowing in Beit Hanoun and Beit Lahya. With the help of the Unicef, two therapy centers are working at full capacity to provide services for 120 malnutritioned, a medical condition of inadequate diet, children per day. Injured patients needing referral outside Gaza for specialized care were evacuated exclusively through the Egyptian Rafah border crossing. Gaza Ministry of Health reported that between 29 December and 22 January 608 injured were evacuated through Rafah. The Israeli Erez crossing was closed much of the period and only 30 patients were able to exit during the crisis.

Handicap International estimates that up to 50 percent of people injured during the attacks have sustained severe injuries that will require rehabilitation to prevent permanent disability. Of the 1.5 million people living in the Gaza Strip, international and national agencies working in disability and rehabilitation estimate that, even before the military operation, over 10 percent had moderate or severe impairments. They estimate that as many as half of the 5,380 men, women and children injured over the past three weeks of conflict may suffer lifelong impairment, exacerbated by the inability of rehabilitation workers to provide early intervention. These agencies has highlighted the importance of providing early intervention for those newly injured, especially those discharged prematurely from health facilities; re-establishing and strengthening the capacity of rehabilitation services and disabled peoples organizations to respond to the increased need. This is especially critical given that the main provider of specialist rehabilitation services in Gaza sustained severe damage and is not yet fully operational. Even before 27 December, the first day of the attacks, there was already a back-log of people waiting for specialised services including rehabilitation and surgery.

The Unicef and the International Red Cross warn from the dangers proposed by the unexploded ordnance, which killed two children as of 20 January. Gaza is one of the most densely populated areas in the world, which renders the problem much more acute. The unexploded ammunition problem represents a major threat for the population, the rescue teams working in the field and can hold back the pace of humanitarian work. Those unexploded weapons are also considered a major obstacle to the work of organizations removing rubble. On 16 February, one person was killed and four wounded by an unexploded ordnance in Beit Lahia. Pupils also discovered white phosphorus wedges in a school in Tal El Hawa. The UN stated that the inability to identify a suitable area to which ordnance can be demolished remains a major constraint, as also the inability to bring any of the materials and equipment needed to destroy or isolate the ordnance to Gaza.

==== Psychological effects ====
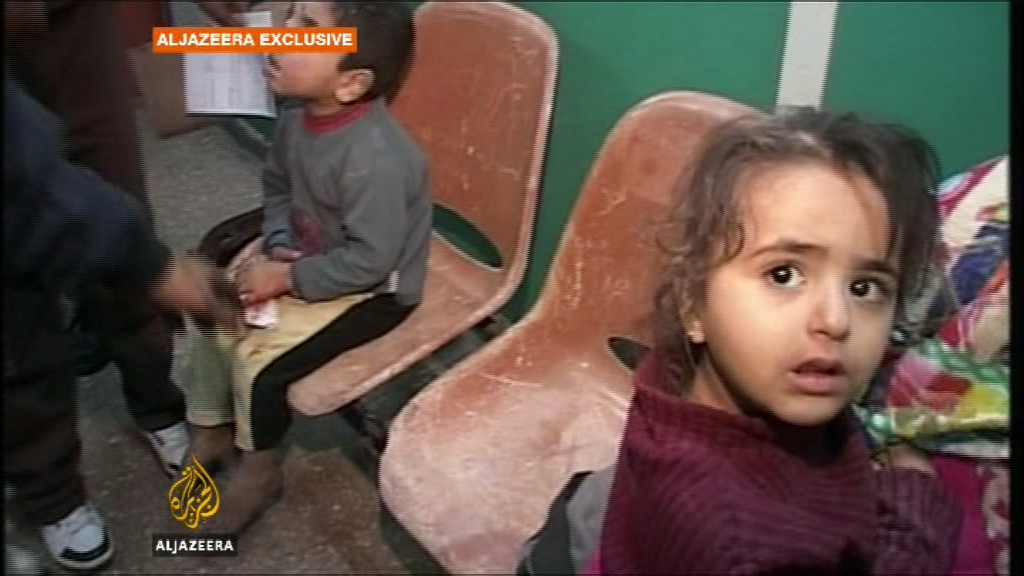
Shocked children who are bearing the brunt of violence of the military engagement in Gaza.

Widespread panic was reported among student population, exacerbated by the attack timing during school hours. Classes were in session at the time of the IAF airstrikes, with some students sitting for midyear exams. Other students were either on their way to school for the afternoon shift, or returning home. Parents rushed to schools to collect their children. The United Nations has several times warned from the devastating effects of the attacks on children, who form 56% percent of the population, and who are bearing the brunt of violence and a significant proportion of the injured who are severely maimed. Schools are currently focusing on providing psychological and mental health support to the students, before resuming teaching core subjects. The head of Gaza's mental health program, has said that half of the population will suffer from post-traumatic stress disorder as a result of the crisis. The UN states that according to reports by the consultancy company Near East Consulting, about 96 percent of Gaza residents feel depressed and disheartened. The highest level of depression is in North Gaza and Rafah, where 81 percent of the respondents do not feel secure about their households and family members.

The World Health Organization estimates that 25,000 to 50,000 new people are likely to be in need of psychological intervention for longer term effects of the hostilities. Groups particularly at risk include separated children, people with pre-existing mental disabilities, pre-existing or new physical disabilities, elderly who have lost family support and female-headed households. A UNDP report on the aftermath of the Israeli military operation highlights that over 1 million of 1.4 million, 75% of the Gaza population, feel insecure and that although moust households have suffered from limited access to basics such as food, water, sanitation, and money, their highest need is personal security.

=== Energy ===
The only power plant in Gaza is not operational due to the lack of industrial fuel and spare parts. As of 1 January, power outages last 16 hours per day. Due to localised damage following the airstrikes, some electrical lines have been cut, causing some areas to suffer from power cuts lasting 24 hours. In addition, due to the damage caused by the air strikes to 15 electrical transformers, as many as 250,000 people in central and northern Gaza have no electricity supply during the entire day and night. On 1 January, a 5MW line from Egypt to Rafah was damaged, extending the power cuts to Rafah, which usually has a continuous supply. Fuel for heating and cooking are no longer available and most of the 240 gas stations in Gaza City have been closed.

As of 4 January, there is almost total blackout in Gaza City, North Gaza, Middle Area and Khan Yunis. 90% of the telephone network, including both cellular service and land lines, is down, since it depends on backup generators with dwindling fuel stocks. Since the Israeli ground operation, 75% of Gaza's electricity has been cut off and the Palestinian technicians face difficulties reaching damaged lines because of the military attacks. As of 7 January, much of the population of the Gaza Strip continues to live without electricity. By 16 January, the twenty first day of the attacks, most households still do not have any electricity. As of 22 January, twenty five days after the beginnings of the attacks, 40 percent of the 1.5 million population remains without electricity. The remaining 60 percent receive only intermittent supply that can reach only 6 hours per day in the north of the Gaza strip. Spare parts and other equipments are a priority. After 8 days of the ceasefire, a month since the beginning of the attacks, the power plant is working on only one turbine, producing 30 MW instead of the daily full capacity of 80 MW cause of the lack of industrial fuel. By 29 January, the electricity situation has returned to its pre-27 December status, with much of the Gaza strip receiving only intermittent electricity. Certain areas are receiving very little power as a result or some low-voltage lines breakage. In order to meet demand throughout the territory, GEDCO (Gaza Electricity Distribution Co.) has put in place a power cut schedule where Gaza and North Gaza will face power cuts of eight hours three times a week; and the Middle Area and Khan Yunis will face power cuts of 6–8 hours twice per week. Those cuts does include unintentional power cuts.

GEDCO estimates the damage to the electricity network due to the recent hostilities at over $10 million. Even before the conflict, its reserves of spare parts were close to depletion due to the 18-month blockade on Gaza. By 29 January 38 transformers essential for the repair of the electricity system are still waiting permission from the Israelis to be allowed into Gaza. Due to the lack of supplies, GEDCO continues to partially repair the network where possible. The UN warns that those ad-hoc partial repairs will increase technical losses by 25-30 percent, reduce the lifetime of network components, and further expose sections of the network to possible collapse. Since the cease-fire, Israel has allowed approximately 87 tonnes cooking gas per day, which is much less than the estimated need of 300 tonnes per day. No petrol or diesel has been allowed into Gaza since 2 November, except for UNRWA. No petrol, diesel or cooking gas was allowed by Israel into Gaza between 8 and 14 February.

=== Water ===
Since 5 November, there has been a shortage of chlorine for water treatment due to Israeli blockades, increasing the risk of outbreak of water diseases. On 27 December, Israeli airstrikes extensively damaged two water wells, rendering a population of 30,000 Palestinians without water. On 2 January, airstrikes in the al-Mughraqa area damaged a main drinking water pipe, cutting off water supplies to 30,000 people in the Nuseirat Camp. The UN sums the situation that as of 2 January, 250,000 people in Gaza City and northern Gaza are without water supply; seven water wells were seriously damaged and cannot be repaired due to bombardments. As of 4 January, and as reported by the Palestinian Coastal Municipality Water Utility (CMWU) throughout the UN reports, 70% of the Gaza strip 1.5 million population have no access to water, in particular in Gaza City and northern Gaza. As of 6 January, 800,000 Palestinians have no access to water, and those who still enjoy water access face problems in purifying such water as well as risking additional danger of contamination due to waste water leakage. This situation lasts in the third week of the attacks where 500,000 Palestinians still have no access to running water, another 500,000 receive water for four to six hours only every five to seven days, and the rest receive water for four to six hours every two or three days. Five days after the unilateral lull, one fifth of the Gaza strip 1.5 million population has no direct access to drinking water and currently depends on water purchased from private suppliers. As of 26, 8 January days after the unilateral ceasefire, at least 70% of the water system is functioning, although this does not mean that everyone is receiving water due to localized damage. By 5 February, a month and 8 days since the beginning of the Israeli attacks, the CMWU reports that 50 percent of Gaza's 1.5 million population receives running water for 6–8 hours every second day; 30 percent of the population receives running water every third day; and ten percent of the population receives water every five days. Ten percent of the population does not receive running water and depends on tankered water. As of 9 February, the CMWU reports that 50,000 people do not have access to water and an additional 150,000-200,000 receive water every 5 or 6 days. According to the World Health Organization guidelines, 80% of drinking water in Gaza is not currently safe for human consumption. In light of the poor quality of water, the Ministry of Health and the UNICEF has stated concerns about the increased risk of diarrhea and other water-borne diseases in infants.

In a damage assessment carried by the CMWU, four water wells in Beit Hanoun, Gaza City, and Jabalia have been totally destroyed. Damage to several water carriers are widely reported. Preliminary findings shows that some Gaza areas like Al Atatra and Izbet Abd Raboo sustained 50 percent of their water networks damaged, while others have sustained a 30 to 35 percent damage to their networks. In total, 5,708 roof-top tanks were completely destroyed, and 2,985 were damaged. 2,204 solar heaters were destroyed and 1,762 were damaged. In some areas, the price of tankered water is as high as 175 Israeli new sheqel per metre cube. Several humanitarian organizations including Action Against Hunger, CARE, ICRC, Oxfam, and Unicef continue to provide drinking water to people in need, and also material and financial support to the CMWU for emergency repairs. Oxfam and Action Against Hunger report a short supply of water tanks for distributing water, which makes it difficult for them to cover all areas in need. The CMWU has created a list of prioritized elements items including pipes, generators, and pumps awaiting clearance by the Israeli authorities for entry into Gaza. The International Red Cross requested approval from the Israeli authorities for the entry of 36 trucks containing such repair material, but only 13 trucks were allowed. The PVC pipes that the Red Cross previously cleared were refused entry by the Israeli authorities. On 9 February, the UN states that the entry of needed spare parts into Gaza remains problematic, and as a consequence major repairs to Gaza's water network can not take place.

=== Sanitation ===
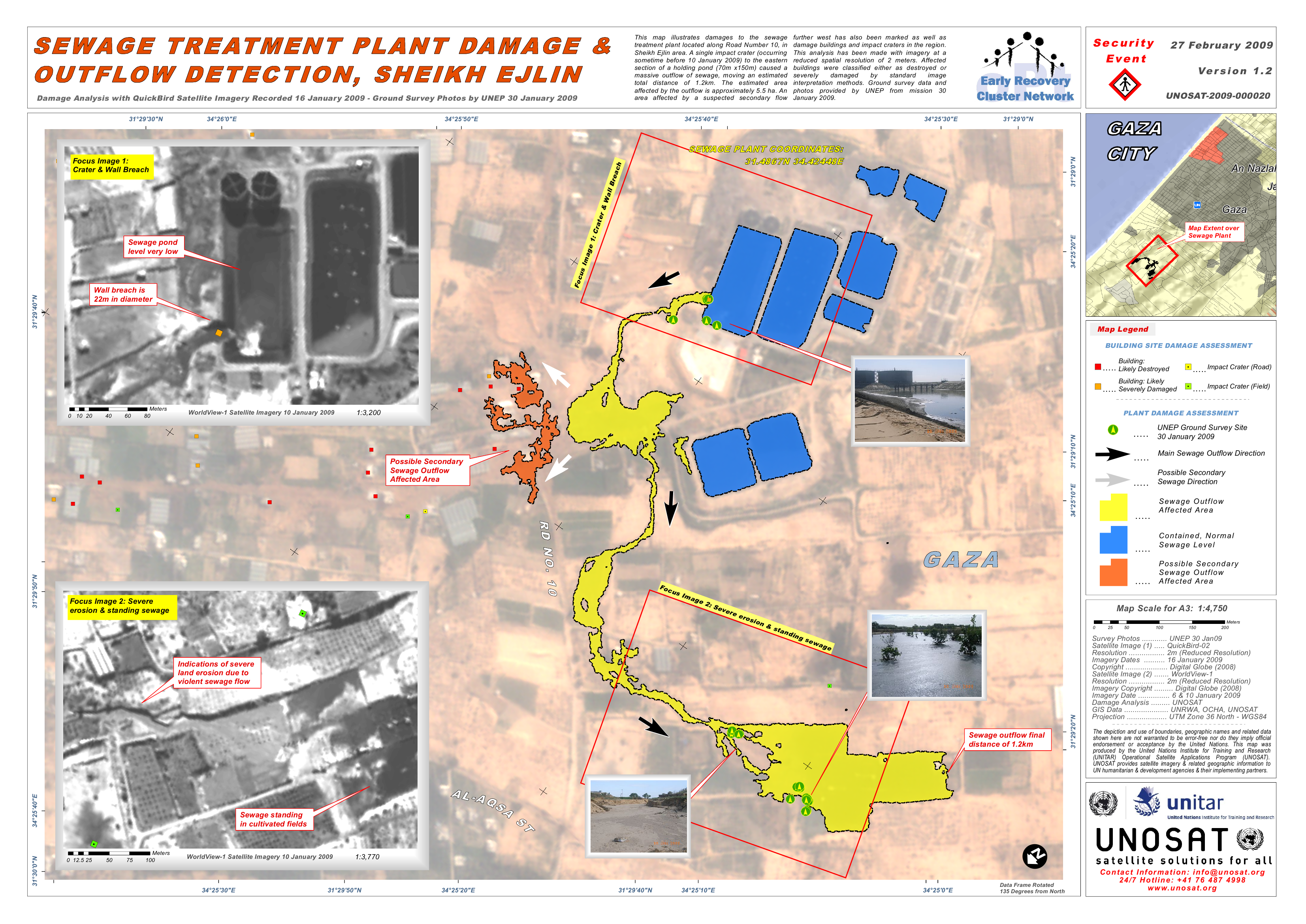
A satellite-based damage assessment of sewage treatment plant damage and outflow detection in Sheikh Ejlin. A single impact crater to the eastern section of a holding pond caused a massive outflow of sewage, moving an estimated total distance of 1.2km. United Nations (UNOSAT). March 2009

Since 31 December, sewage and water systems in Beit Hanoun were hit at five locations causing considerable damage to the main sewage pipeline leading to sewage water pouring into the streets. The sanitation system cannot treat the sewage and is dumping 40 million litres of raw sewage into the sea daily. On 3 January, The UN reported emerging fears that continued shelling near the Beit Lahiya sewage lagoon, which contains 3 million cubic metres of waste water, will cause a massive sewage overflow. In addition to agricultural areas, up to 15,000 people are directly at risk. As of 5 January, Gaza sewage system was on the verge of collapse due to the lack of power and fuel; sewage is flooding into Beit Lahya, farmland and the sea. As of 13 January, UNRWA was still unable to deliver fuel to water treatment plants to alleviate pressure on the banks of the Beit Lahiya lagoon. On 16 January, eyewitnesses report that a stream of sewage is flowing up to one kilometer from the Gaza City water treatment plant. Since 31 December and As of 19 January, a day after twenty-three days of the Israeli attacks, sewage continues to flow in the streets of Beit Lahya and Beit Hanoun, 30 cubic meters of sewage are flowing into the streets of Beit Hanoun every hour. By 29 January, following repairs, sewage is no longer leaking in the streets of Beit Lahia and Beit Hanoun.

In the CMWU damage assessment report, waste water networks in Gaza City, Beit Hanoun, Jabalia, and Beit Lahia have sustained severe damage. The Ash Sheikh 'Ijleen sewage plant which treats the raw sewage of an area inhabited by 400,000 people has been out of order since it was struck by a shell in the second week of the conflict. The final report of the damage assessment carried out by the CMWU reveals that repairing the water and wastewater network and facilities will cost approximately 6 million US dollars, including 830,000 dollars to repair the wastewater network. According to the Palestinian Hydrology Group, solid waste is accumulating in most areas affected by the hostilities, with the exception of Gaza city where only two areas face problems with solid waste. The group also reported that on 13 February, 3,000 litres of fuel had leaked into wastewater infiltration basin of the Beit Lahia emergency wastewater treatment plant, posing a risk for chemical contamination of the aquifer by hydrocarbons. Major repairs can not take place without the entry of needed spare parts into Gaza, which remains problematic.

=== Banknotes ===
The Israeli shekel is a widely used currency in the Gaza Strip, and the territory needs at least 400 million shekels, or about $100 million each month in new currency to replace aging notes and to pay salaries. Since 24 December, the ban on the entry of banknotes into Gaza has hampered several humanitarian programs run by the UNRWA, the largest humanitarian assistance provider in the Gaza Strip. Cash needs for the UNRWA included banknotes for distribution programs to 94,000 dependent "Special Hardship" families, for suppliers and contractors of critical programs including school feedings, as well as for its "cash for work" program. As of 18 January, the first day following the twenty-two days of attacks, cash has still not entered the strip and was urgently needed, including for the UNRWA activities.

After the operation, cash was still urgently needed to reactivate the private sector and prevent increasing dependence on humanitarian aid. This lack of cash also prevented access to basic supplies including the limited stocks of food in the markets. By 5, 18 February days after the operation, cash still did not enter the strip except for a few international organizations. The UN Humanitarian Affairs office stated that a system must be urgently established that ensures the regular and predictable monthly transfer of the necessary cash. On 6 February, Israel allowed the transfer of 42 million US dollars from banks in the West Bank to the Gaza Strip. According to the Bank of Palestine, this money transfer will enable the Palestinian Authority to pay the salaries of its 70,000 Gaza based employees. Israel last allowed cash in mid-December 2008. Afterwards, the UN reported that more cash is needed for private sector reactivation and to prevent increasing dependence on aid.

=== Economic infrastructure ===
Extensive destruction was caused to commercial enterprises and to public infrastructure. According to Palestinian industrialists, 219 factories were destroyed or severely damaged during the Israeli military operation. Of the three per cent of industrial capacity that was still operating after the 18-month Israeli blockade, much has now been destroyed. The biggest Palestinian food-processing plant, Alweyda was devastated, as were both Abu Eida, the largest ready-mixed concrete producer, with four factories demolished, and the Al Badr flour mills, with the biggest storage facilities in the Strip. All three had close and long-standing contact with Israeli partner firms and suppliers. The owners stated that they see this as part of an economic war to make Gaza dependent on Israel.

According to the World Food Programme, between 35 and 60 percent of the agriculture industry has been damaged by the Israeli military operation. The Food and Agriculture Organization estimates that 13,000 families who depend directly on farming, herding and fishing have suffered significant damage to their livelihoods.

=== Crossings and aid ===
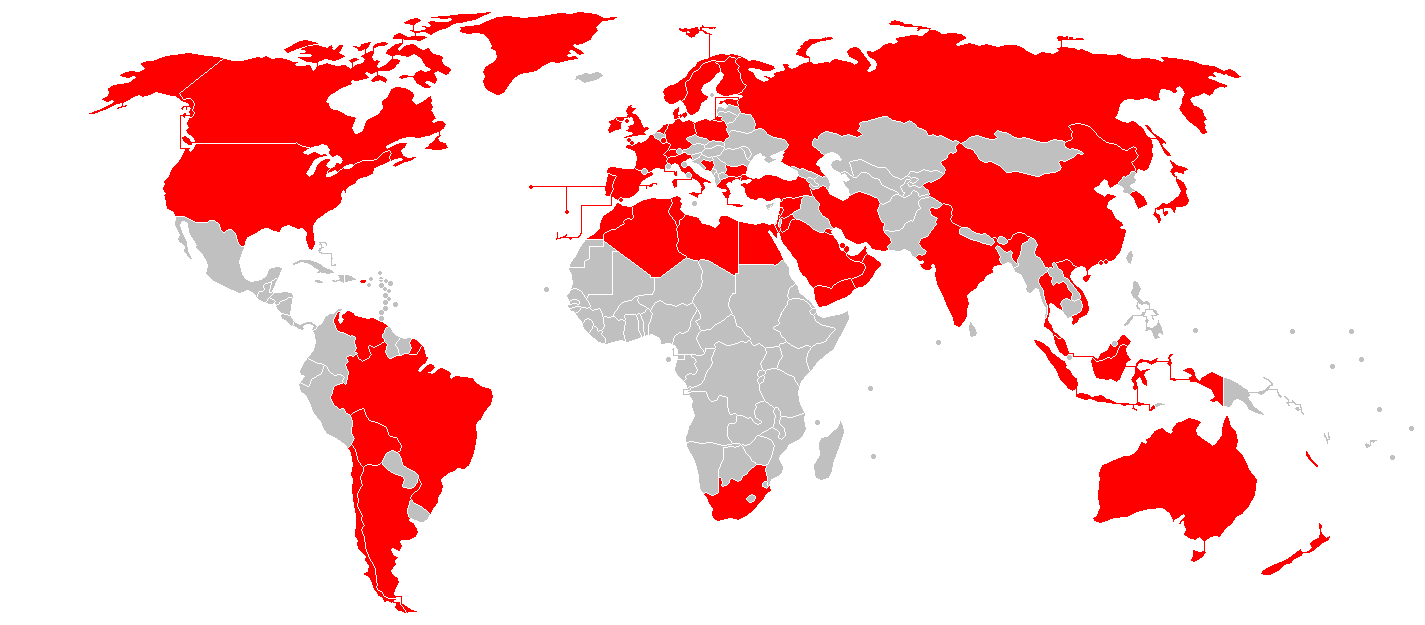
Map of countries giving emergency aid to Gaza in 2009.

There has been an extreme shortage of trucks entering the Gaza strip since the beginning of the conflict. In December 2005, an average of 631 trucks was entering Gaza strip on a daily basis. This figure has dropped to 475 trucks daily by May 2007, and by 27 December 2008, the first day of the attacks, Kerem Shalom has a daily average of 73 trucks entering the Gaza strip. The UN reports that international agencies have faced "unprecedented denial" of access to Gaza since 5 November. Humanitarian access remains unreliable and needs to be granted everyday without restriction. By 5 February, one month and 8 days after the beginning of Israeli attacks, the UN reported that the number of truckloads of aid permitted to enter Gaza daily by the Israeli authorities remains insufficient.

John Holmes, the United Nations Under-Secretary-General for Humanitarian Affairs and Emergency Relief Coordinator has stated in his statement to the Security Council that after the end of the Israeli operation, and on "good days", only 120 truckloads gets into Gaza, instead of the normal daily requirement, including commercial traffic, of 500 trucks at minimum. Essential items such as construction materials, water pipes, electrical wires, and transformers continue to be effectively banned, or only allowed infrequently after "endless haggling", Holmes declared. He also added that commercial goods must be allowed in and out, since Gaza Palestinians "do not want or deserve to be dependent on humanitarian aid" and that the "limited trickle" of items into Gaza continue the effective collective punishment of the civilian population and force the counter-productive reliance on tunnels for daily essentials.

The Gas Station Owners Association in Gaza reported a significant drop in the amount of fuel smuggled through the Gaza-Egyptian border since the beginning of February, largely due to the destruction of tunnels by Israel. The UN reports that sources in Rafah suggest a decrease in amount of merchandise being smuggled into Gaza through the tunnels due to the ongoing Israeli attacks. The UN reports that although the Israeli authorities have informed the humanitarian community that 150 trucks would be allowed into Gaza per day, capacity has not exceeded 120 truckloads. In addition, only a restricted list of items is being allowed into Gaza.

As of the morning of 28 January, approximately 30 International NGO staff members were in Gaza, along with approximately 22 UN international staff members. There are outstanding requests for over 200 people to enter Gaza and this number is growing "by the day". The chair of the Association of International Development Agencies, which includes 75 humanitarian organizations has stated that "it is unacceptable that staff of international aid agencies with expertise in emergency response are still not given full access into Gaza, and that the crossings are not fully operational for humanitarian and commercial goods". Many NGOs have failed to receive a response from the Israeli authorities regarding their applications, while others were requested to provide additional information regarding their specific mandates, activities and funding sources. Others have been denied entry altogether. The UN reports that a key problem has been inconsistency in the application process; some staff members are informed that they have been approved, only to be denied entry when they attempt to cross Erez. In other cases, staff receive conflicting information from Israeli authorities regarding regulations that must be met before entry is allowed. The UN has described the Israeli procedures as inconsistent and unpredictable ones that impedes the ability of organizations to effectively plan their humanitarian response and obstructs efforts to address the humanitarian crisis.

On 2 February, the UN reported that the number of truckloads of aid permitted to enter Gaza daily by the Israeli authorities remains insufficient, and humanitarian organizations continue to face serious restrictions to enter Gaza. On 16 February and on behalf of the humanitarian community, The Logistic Cluster was negotiating with the Israeli authorities regarding transport of goods into Gaza. A list of priority items for transport into the Gaza Strip, which was consolidated based on input from sector leads to reflect humanitarian needs in Gaza, is being used as the basis for negotiations with the Israeli authorities.

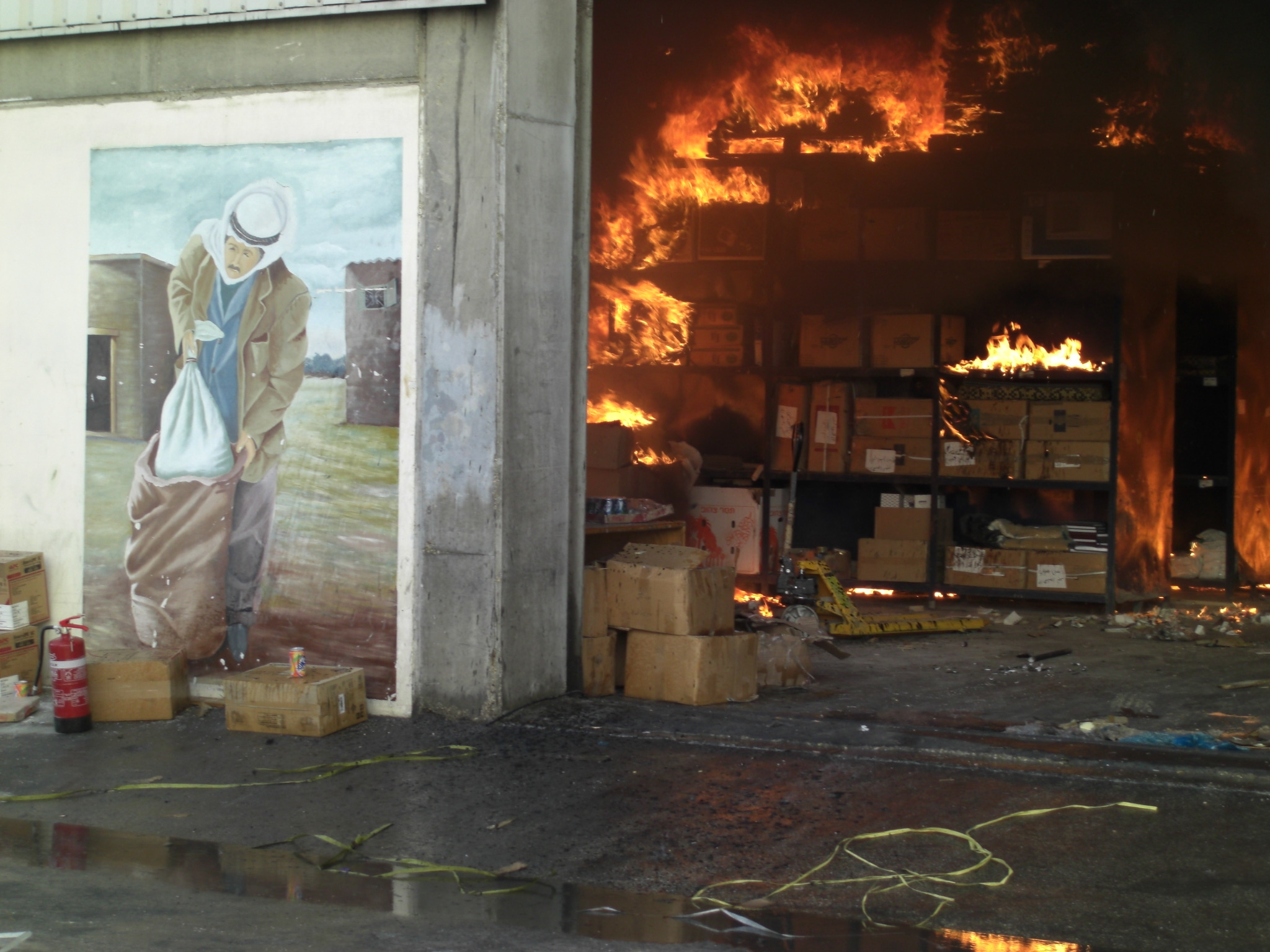
United Nations Relief and Works Agency building shelled during the conflict

On 7 January, Israel agreed to a three-hour humanitarian truce, allowing supplies and fuel into Gaza. The UN welcomed the move, but stated that round the clock assistance was required to meet the population humanitarian needs. The Human Rights Council expressed a similar position. The International Red Cross, United Nations and aid workers have reported intolerable conditions and a deepening humanitarian crisis in Gaza. The Red Cross has accused the Israeli military of failing "to meet its obligation under international humanitarian law."

On 9 January, the UN resumed aid work, after receiving assurances from Israel that its workers will no longer be targeted. As of 14 January 2009, close to 900 trucks (including 20,000 tons of basic foods and medical supplies) have been delivered to Gaza. Addressing the aid situation on 7 January, Save the Children stated that, "The small amount of aid allowed in, while better than nothing, is a pitiful gesture in the face of such an overwhelming humanitarian crisis," noting that insufficient amounts of food, fuel and medical supplies were delivered. The UN has also stated that the aid delivered is insufficient to address the chronic humanitarian crisis given the "scale of the attacks".

On 3 February, blankets and food parcels were confiscated by Hamas police personnel from an UNRWA distribution center, and on 4 February, the UN Emergency Relief Coordinator demanded that the aid be returned immediately. The Hamas government issued a statement stating that the incident was a misunderstanding between the drivers of the trucks and has been resolved through direct contact with the UNRWA. On 9 February, UNRWA lifted the suspension on the movement of its humanitarian supplies into Gaza, after the Hamas authorities returned all of the aid supplies confiscated.

Several countries have pledged aid after the offensive on Gaza began, promising financial support and humanitarian assistance (see map). Aid delivering international organizations include the European Union, UNRWA, the Red Cross, the Red Crescent, the Red Star of David, and the World Food Programme.

== Effects on Israel ==
The Israeli Home Front Command issued detailed emergency instructions to Israeli citizens for preparing for and dealing with rocket attacks from the Gaza Strip. The instructions included orders to stay within a certain distance of bomb shelters based on proximity to the source of the rockets. Residents adjacent to the Gaza border were instructed to remain in fortified rooms. Israelis ascribed their low civilian casualties to an orderly public response to these instructions. Hamas Grad rockets' increased range of 40 km put more than 700,000 Israelis within strike range.

=== Internal refugees ===
A large section of the residents of Ashkelon, a southern coastal city put in range of Grad-type rockets since the beginning of the conflict, fled the city for the relative safety of central and northern Israel. On 10–11 January, according to Israeli media, 40 percent of the residents fled the city, despite calls by the Mayor to stay.

=== Closure of schools ===
Beginning 27 December, schools and universities in southern Israel closed due to rocket threats. Hamas rockets landed on Israeli educational facilities several times (such as empty schools in Beersheba) from 2008 to 2009, with no casualties as of 15 January, except for cases of shock. Studies resumed starting 11 January, with IDF Home Front Command representatives stationed at schools. Only schools with fortified classrooms and bomb shelters were allowed to bring in children. Israeli Education Minister Yuli Tamir said she hoped a return to school would provide a little structure and routine in a time of great stress and uncertainty for the children. However, students were reluctant to return, with students at Sapir College in Sderot reporting less than 25 percent attendance.

The largest hospital on Israel's southern coast, Ashkelon's Barzilai Hospital, forced its critical treatment facilities into an underground shelter after a Gaza-fired rocket struck beside its helicopter pad on 28 December 2008.

== Effects on foreigners ==
At the start of the conflict, more than a thousand foreigners were living in or near Gaza, including nationals from several Western nations, most of them were Palestinian dual citizens and spouses of Palestinians. As of 8 January, diplomats estimated that some 400 foreign nationals from 22 countries remained in Gaza. Agencies assisting in the evacuation of foreigners, including the Red Cross, stated that their efforts were hampered by the violence, by bureaucratic obstacles and by lack of coordination between Israel, the United Nations and host countries. On 4 January, New York City Mayor Michael Bloomberg was rushed into a bomb shelter as warning sirens sounded while he was visiting the Israeli city of Sderot. On 8 January, in Gaza city, a Ukrainian woman and her child were killed, while her other child was injured. One of the militants killed was proven to be Saudi Arabian on 15 January.

== International ==
Antisemitic incidents escalated worldwide in frequency and intensity during the Gaza War, and were widely considered to be a wave of reprisal attacks in response to the conflict.
