= Timeline of al-Qaeda attacks =

The following is a list of attacks which have been carried out by al-Qaeda.

== 1990s ==
=== 1992 ===
- On December 29, 1992, the first attack by al-Qaeda was carried out in Aden, Yemen, known as the 1992 Aden hotel bombings. That evening, a bomb went off at the Gold Mohur hotel, where U.S. troops had been staying while en route to Somalia, though the troops had already left when the bomb exploded. The bombers targeted a second hotel, the Aden Movenpick, where they believed American troops might also be staying. That bomb detonated prematurely in the hotel car park, around the same time as the other bomb explosion, killing an Austrian tourist and a Yemeni citizen. Osama bin Laden claimed responsibility for the attack in 1998.

=== 1993 ===
- On February 26, 1993, the World Trade Center was attacked by terrorists for the first time. A bomb built in Jersey City was driven into an underground garage of the World Trade Center. The blast killed six people and injured over 1,000 others. The attack was not an official al-Qaeda operation, though the attack's mastermind, Ramzi Yousef, had trained in al-Qaeda camps. Osama bin Laden was never charged for the attack.

=== 1995 ===
- On November 13, 1995, a car bomb exploded at a facility in Riyadh, Saudi Arabia, where the U.S. military was training Saudi National Guardsmen. Five Americans and two Indians were killed and 60 people were wounded. The attack has been credited to al-Qaeda by the government of Saudi Arabia although bin Laden never took credit for the bombing.

=== 1998 ===
- In August 1998, Al-Qaeda operatives carried out the bombings of the U.S. embassies in Nairobi, Kenya, and Dar es Salaam, Tanzania, killing 224 people and injuring more than 5 others.

== 2000s ==
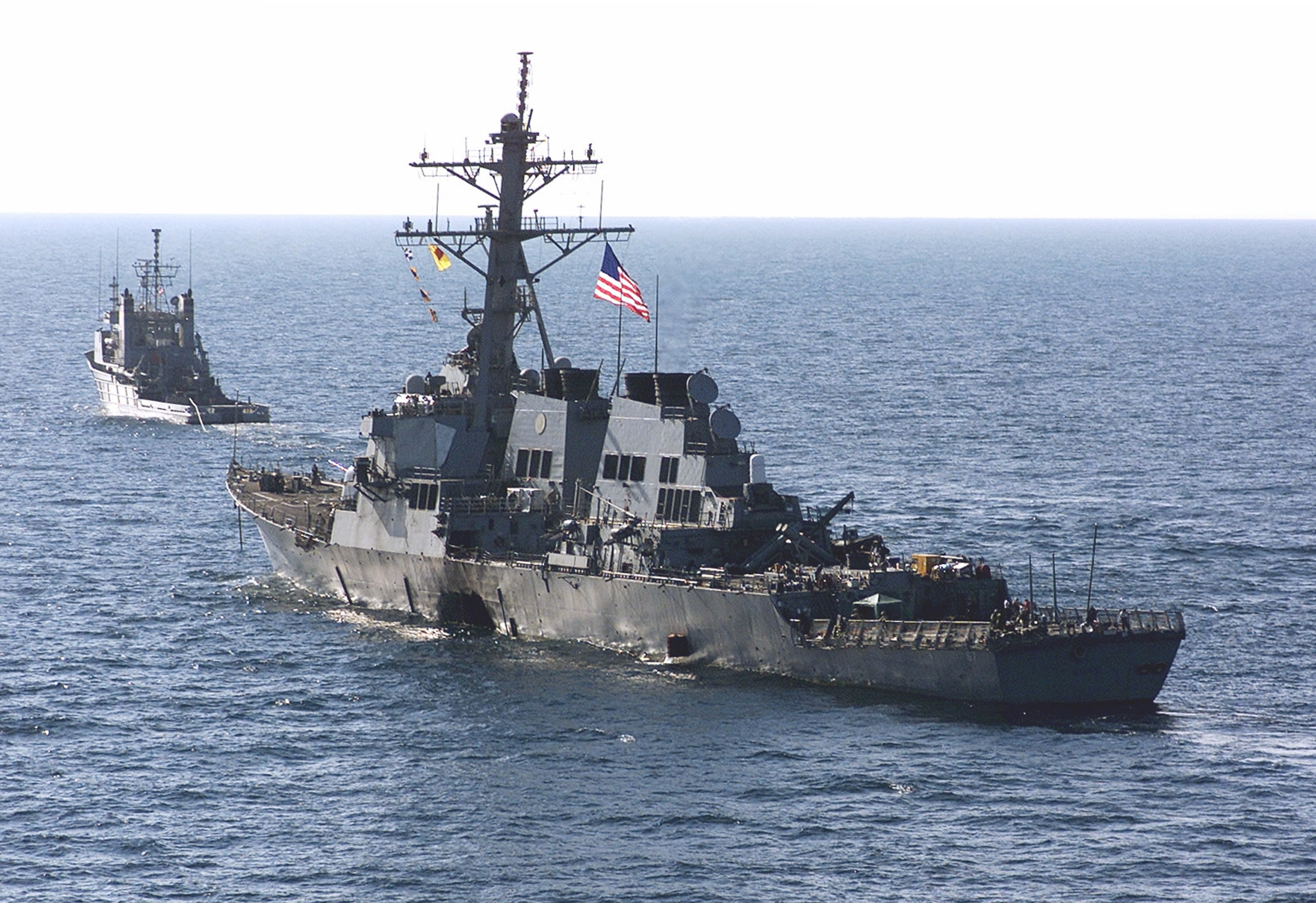
USS Cole after it was bombed

=== 2000 ===
- Al-Qaeda planned to attack USS The Sullivans on January 3, 2000, but the effort failed due to too much weight being put on the small boat meant to bomb the ship.
- Despite the setback with USS The Sullivans, al-Qaeda succeeded in bombing a U.S. Navy warship in October 2000 with the USS Cole bombing, killing 17 sailors.

=== 2001 ===
- On September 9, 2001, two Tunisian members of al-Qaeda assassinated Ahmed Shah Massoud, the leader of the Northern Alliance. One of the suicide attackers was killed by the explosion, while the other was captured and shot while trying to escape. It is believed that bin Laden ordered Massoud's assassination to help his Taliban protectors and ensure he would have their cooperation in Afghanistan.
- The most destructive act ascribed to al-Qaeda was the series of attacks in the United States on September 11, 2001. Four commercial jet airliners were hijacked. Two of these were crashed into the Twin Towers which later collapsed, destroying the rest of the World Trade Center building complex. The third was crashed into the Pentagon and the fourth in a field during a struggle between passengers and hijackers to control the airplane. Nearly 3,000 people were killed in the attacks, making them the deadliest act of terrorism to occur in history, and more than 6,000 others were injured. An investigation conducted after the attacks concluded that members of al-Qaeda planned and orchestrated the attacks. Bin Laden initially denied his organization's involvement, but later in 2004 admitted his organization was responsible and claimed responsibility for the attacks. The U.S., amongst other 40 countries, later invaded Afghanistan to dismantle al-Qaeda, sparking the War in Afghanistan and dismantling the Taliban regime as well.
- On December 22, 2001, al-Qaeda operative Richard Reid attempted to detonate explosives packed into the shoes he was wearing, while on American Airlines Flight 63 from Paris to Miami. In 2002, Reid pleaded guilty in U.S. federal court to eight criminal counts of terrorism, based on his attempt to destroy a commercial aircraft in-flight. He was sentenced to life in prison without parole and is held in a super maximum security prison in the United States.

=== 2002 ===
- The April 11, 2002 Ghriba synagogue bombing occurred when a natural gas truck fitted with explosives drove past security barriers at the ancient Ghriba Synagogue on the Tunisian island of Djerba. The truck detonated at the front of the synagogue, killing 14 German tourists, three Tunisians, and two French nationals, More than 30 others were wounded. Al Qaeda later claimed responsibility for the attack.
- The 2002 Limburg bombing occurred on 6 October 2002. The Limburg was carrying 397,000 barrels (63,100 m3) of crude oil from Iran to Malaysia, and was in the Gulf of Aden off Yemen to pick up another load of oil. It was registered under a French-flag and had been chartered by the Malaysian petrol firm Petronas. While it was some distance offshore, an explosives-laden dinghy rammed the starboard side of the tanker and detonated. The vessel caught on fire and approximately 90,000 barrels (14,000 m3) of oil leaked into the Gulf of Aden. Although Yemeni officials initially claimed that the explosion was caused by an accident, later investigations found traces of TNT on the damaged ship. One crew member, a 38-year-old Bulgarian named Atanas Atanasov, was killed, and 12 other crew members were injured.
- On October 8, 2002, two Kuwaiti citizens with ties to jihadists in Afghanistan launched the Faylaka Island attack against United States Marines. The Marines were on a training exercise on Failaka Island, an island off the coast of Kuwait. One Marine was killed, and another was seriously injured. The two Kuwaitis, Anas Al Kandari and Jassem al-Hajiri were also killed. They were reported to have served as volunteers with the Taliban, in Afghanistan, prior to the American response to the attacks of September 11, 2001.
- The 2002 Bali bombings occurred on October 12, 2002, in the tourist district of Kuta, Indonesia. The attacks killed 202 people and was attributed to the Indonesian terrorist group Jemaah Islamiyah, which has direct links to al-Qaeda.
- The 2002 Mombasa attacks occurred on November 28, 2002, in Kenya. Al Qaeda later claimed responsibility for the attacks.

=== 2003 ===
- The 2003 Riyadh compound bombings occurred on 12 May 2003, in Riyadh, Saudi Arabia. Al-Qaeda gunmen stormed building complexes inhabited by Western expatriates, killing 39 people and wounding over 160.
- The 2003 Casablanca bombings occurred on May 16, 2003, in Casablanca, Morocco. 45 people were killed as a result of these attacks (12 suicide-bombers and 33 victims).
- The 2003 Marriott Hotel bombing occurred on August 5, 2003, in Jakarta, Indonesia. A suicide bomber detonated a car bomb outside the lobby of the newly opened JW Marriott luxury hotel, killing twelve people and injuring 150. Those killed were mostly Indonesian, with the exception of one Dutch.
- The 2003 Istanbul bombings were four truck bomb attacks carried out on November 15, 2003, and November 20, 2003, in Istanbul, Turkey, leaving 57 people dead, and 700 wounded. The attacks targeted two synagogues, a British consulate, and a British bank in Istanbul.

=== 2004 ===
- The 2004 Madrid train bombings were a series of coordinated, nearly simultaneous bombings against the Cercanías commuter train system of Madrid, Spain, on the morning of 11 March 2004—three days before Spain's general elections. The explosions killed 193 people and injured around 2,500.
- Four Al-Qaeda gunmen carried out the 2004 Khobar attacks on May 29, 2004.

=== 2005 ===
- The 7 July London bombings were a series of four co-ordinated suicide attacks carried out by Islamist terrorists that targeted commuters travelling on London's public transport during the morning rush hour resulting in 56 deaths (including the 4 bombers). Al-Qaeda claimed responsibility for the attacks.
- The November 2005 Amman bombings were suicide attacks on 3 hotels in Jordan during a Palestinian wedding. 57 people were killed and another 115 were injured.

=== 2007 ===
- Al-Qaeda is believed to have been responsible for the failed assassination attempt on former Pakistani prime minister Benazir Bhutto on October 18, 2007.
- al-Qaeda in the Islamic Maghreb launched two car bomb attacks on December 11, 2007, which targeted Algerian Constitutional court and a UN office in Algiers.

=== 2008 ===
- Al-Qaeda claimed responsibility for the bombing of the Danish embassy in Pakistan on June 2, 2008. Mustafa Abu al-Yazid, a high-ranking member of Al-Qaeda, issued a statement after the bombing, claiming that the attack was a response to the 2005 publication of the Muhammed Cartoons.
- The Battle of Wanat occurred on July 13, 2008, when forces including Al-Qaeda and Taliban guerrillas attacked NATO troops near the village of Wanat in the Waygal district in Afghanistan's far eastern province of Nuristan. The Battle of Wanat has been described as the "Black Hawk Down" of the War in Afghanistan, as one of the bloodiest attacks of the war and one of several attacks on remote outposts.[8] In contrast to previous roadside bombs and haphazard attacks and ambushes, this attack was well coordinated with fighters from many insurgent and terrorist groups with an effort that was disciplined and sustained which was able to target key assets such as the TOW launcher with precision.

=== 2009 ===
- Shortly after the arrest of Umar Farouk Abdulmutallab in the December 25, 2009, following an attempted bombing on Northwest Airlines Flight 253, the suspect reportedly told officials he had traveled to Yemen for training by Al-Qaeda, although British counterterrorism officials dismissed the claims. President Barack Obama's top security official Janet Napolitano on December 27 stated "Right now we have no indication it's part of anything larger", warning it would be "inappropriate to speculate" that Al-Qaeda had sent Abdulmutallab on a suicide mission. On December 28, Obama called it an "attempted terrorist attack" and promised "to use every element of our national power to disrupt, to dismantle and defeat the violent extremists who threaten us, whether they are from Afghanistan or Pakistan...". That same day, al-Qaeda in the Arabian Peninsula (AQAP) claimed responsibility for the attack. The group released photos of Nigerian Umar Farouk Abdulmutallab smiling in a white shirt and white Islamic skullcap with the Al Qaeda in Arabian Peninsula banner in the background. On January 8, 2010, President Barack Obama took responsibility for security lapses exposed by the attack, declaring in televised remarks "We are at war against Al-Qaeda", noting "our adversaries will seek new ways to evade them, as was shown by the Christmas attack" By February 2010, the suspect told federal investigators that cleric Anwar al-Awlaki gave him orders to carry out the attack. Al-Jazeera reported that Awlaki issued a statement that "Brother mujahed Umar Farouk – may God relieve him – is one of my students, yes... We had kept in contact, but I didn't issue a fatwa to Umar Farouk for this operation,".
- An al-Qaeda agent posing as a double agent killed 7 CIA officers in the Camp Chapman attack on December 30, 2009. The Jordanian man, thought to be an American asset penetrating Al-Qaeda was brought in the wire of the camp and detonated an explosive belt, killing 7 CIA, 1 Jordanian intelligence officer, and seriously wounding six others.

== 2010s ==
- Al-Qaeda commander Mustafa Abu al-Yazid claimed responsibility for the bombing of a German bakery in India in a posthumous audio tape released on June 15, 2010. The bombing occurred on February 13, 2010. The blast killed 18 people, and injured at least 54 more.
- After the 2010 Cargo planes bomb plot, two packages were discovered on October 29, 2010, each containing a bomb consisting of 300 to 400 grams (11–14 oz) of plastic explosives and a detonating mechanism. The packages were found on separate cargo planes. The bombs were discovered as a result of intelligence received from Saudi Arabia's security chief. They were bound from Yemen to the United States, and were discovered at en route stop-overs, in England and in Dubai in the United Arab Emirates. On November 5, 2010, AQAP took responsibility for orchestrating the plot. U.S. and British authorities had assumed that AQAP, and specifically Anwar al-Awlaki, were behind the bombing attempts. They also presumed the bombs were most likely constructed by AQAP's main explosives expert, Ibrahim Hassan al-Asiri.
- The In Amenas hostage crisis began on January 16, 2013, when al-Qaeda gunmen affiliated with a brigade led by Mokhtar Belmokhtar took over 800 people hostage at the Tigantourine gas facility near In Amenas, Algeria. The captors demanded an end to French military operations in Mali, in return for the safety of the hostages. At least 37 foreign hostages were killed along with an Algerian security guard, as were 29 militants.
- The Charlie Hebdo shooting occurred in Paris on January 7, 2015. 12 people were killed and 11 were wounded. Al-Qaeda in the Arabian Peninsula claimed responsibility for the attack.
- The suicide bombing of Daallo Airlines Flight 159 occurred on February 2, 2016. Only the suicide bomber was killed. Two passengers were injured. Al-Shabaab claimed responsibility for the attack.
- The Naval Air Station Pensacola shooting occurred in Pensacola, Florida, on December 6, 2019. Three people were killed and 8 were wounded. The shooter was killed by police. Al Qaeda in the Arabian Peninsula claimed responsibility for the attack.

== See also ==
- List of al-Qaeda attacks against Israel

== Sources ==
- Wright, Lawrence (2006). The Looming Tower: Al Qaeda and the Road to 9/11. Alfred A. Knopf. ISBN 0-375-41486-X.
