= Violent conflicts involving the Yishuv =

Armed conflicts involving the Jewish community in British Palestine

Prior to the establishment of the State of Israel in 1948, the Yishuv was involved in several armed conflicts, mostly as part of the Intercommunal conflict in Mandatory Palestine:

	Combatant 1	Combatant 2	Combatant 3	Results
1920 Nebi Musa riots	-	Arab rioters	United Kingdom military forces in Palestine	Creation of the Haganah
1921 Jaffa riots	Jewish civilians	Arab civilians		Haycraft Commission of Inquiry, Churchill White Paper
1929 Hebron–Safed riots	Betar; Haganah	Arab rioters	United Kingdom military forces in Palestine	Radicalization of both Jewish and Arab communities in Palestine, Shaw Report, Hope Simpson Royal Commission, Passfield white paper
1933 Palestine riots		Arab rioters	United Kingdom military forces in Palestine	The British police forces successfully dispersed the rioters.
1936–1939 Arab revolt	Jewish National Council: Haganah; Fosh; Peulot Meyuhadot; Irgun	Arab Higher Committee (1936 – October 1937): Local rebel factions (fasa'il); Volunteers from Arab world; Central Committee of National Jihad in Palestine (October 1937 – 1939): Bureau of the Arab Revolt in Palestine (late 1938 – 1939); Society for the Defense of Palestine	United Kingdom: British Army; Palestine Police Force; Jewish Settlement Police; Jewish Supernumerary Police; Special Night Squads; NDF (from 1937): Arab "peace bands"	Revolt suppressed: Issuance of the White Paper of 1939
World War II (1939–1945)	(United Kingdom) Yishuv volunteers in the British Armed Forces, including No. 51 Commando, the Special Interrogation Group, the Jewish Brigade, and parachutists, and Yishuv volunteers in the British merchant navy.; Haganah; Palmach; Irgun (until 1943)	Axis powers		Allied victory: substantial Yishuv participation in the Allied war effort
1944–1947 Jewish insurgency	Jewish National Council: Irgun (1944–1948); Lehi (1944–1948); Haganah (1945–1946); Palmach; Hish; Him		United Kingdom: British Army; Royal Navy; Royal Air Force; Royal Marines; Palestine Police Force	Zionist victory: British forces unable to suppress insurgency; Insurgency turned British public opinion against the deployment in Palestine, leading to Britain deferring the issue to the United Nations; Start of civil war in Mandatory Palestine in response to the UN Partition Plan
1947–1948 Civil War	(Israel) Jewish National Council; Haganah; Palmach; Irgun; Lehi; Foreign volunteers; Allied Bedouin tribes	Arab Higher Committee; (All-Palestine Protectorate) Army of the Holy War; Arab Liberation Army; Jordan; Arab Legion	United Kingdom; Mandatory Palestine	Jewish National Council victory: Issuance of the Israeli Declaration of Independence; Intervention by neighbouring Arab states, beginning the 1948 Arab–Israeli War

== See also ==
- List of wars involving Israel
- Israeli–Palestinian conflict
