= Terrorism in Israel =

Terrorism in Israel may refer to:

- Timeline of the Israeli–Palestinian conflict
- Israel and state-sponsored terrorism
- Jewish extremist terrorism
- Palestinian political violence
- Israeli settler violence
