= Coastal Municipalities Water Utility =

Organization responsible for water and sanitation services in Palestinian Gaza Strip

The Coastal Municipalities Water Utility is the organization responsible for water and sanitation services in the Palestinian Gaza Strip. Its services were severely damaged during the 2008–2009 Israel–Gaza conflict.
