= Pure homopolar motor =

A pure homopolar motor (PHM) is an electric motor not requiring brushes, electronics, or semiconductor parts to convert direct current into torque. In other words, this homopolar motor only requires a theoretical homogeneous or actual (constantly or cyclically) homogenized magnetic field and direct current, similarly to the Faraday Homopolar Motor (FHM). The theory of PHM is usually explained using Maxwell's equations. In basic courses on theoretical physics you can learn that such a system should be functional and independent of brushes. This term unifies all devices that work in line with this definition. Examples include the following pure homopolar motor patents: US5977684 (A), PV2011-293 (CZ) application number 2011-293, AU5801890 (A)

Another group of patents with a superconductor shield or shield made of so far unknown material (low-voltage semiconductor with high current permeability or material that excludes magnetic field at normal temperatures): US5144179 (A), DE102012022152 (A1), CN1671030 (A)

== See also ==
Pure homopolar generator

=== General ===
- Rotating magnetic field brushless motors with electronics
