= Pure homopolar generator =

A pure homopolar generator (PHG) is an electric generator not requiring brushes or electronics or semiconductor parts to convert torque into direct current. In other words, this homopolar generator only requires theoretical homogeneous or actual (constantly or cyclically) homogenized magnetic field to be able to produce direct current. The theory of PHG is explained using Maxwell's equations. This term unifies all devices that work in line with this definition. PHG can be represented by patents, which should also work the other way round: US5977684 (A), PV2011-293 (CZ) application number 2011-293, AU5801890 (A).

Another group of patents with a superconductor shield or shield made of so far unknown material (low-voltage semiconductor with high current permeability or material that excludes magnetic field under normal temperatures): US5144179 (A), DE102012022152 (A1), CN1671030 (A)

== See also ==
Pure homopolar motor

=== General ===
- Rotating magnetic field brushless motors with electronics
