= Palestinian Hydrology Group =

Organization based in Palestine

Palestinian Hydrology Group مجموعة الهيدرولوجيين الفلسطينيين
- Founded: 1987
- Type: Non-profit
- Purpose: ًWater and Environmental resources development
- Location: Ramallah
- Region served: Palestinian Territories
- Key people: Ayman Rabi (Director)
- Website: Official website

The Palestinian Hydrology Group (PHG) is a Palestinian NGO focusing on water and sanitation issues. It monitors, analyzes and reports on the changing state of water quality, sanitation and water access, pollution and infrastructure.

== Organization ==
The Palestinian Hydrology Group has offices in Gaza, Hebron, Jerusalem, Nablus, and Ramallah.

== Partners ==
- Oxfam
- Care
