= Jaysh al-Ummah (Gaza) =

Palestinian Salafi jihadist militant organization

- Leader: Abu Hafs Al-Maqdisi
- Dates active: 2005 (or 2007/08) – present
- Active regions: Gaza Strip
- Ideology: Salafi jihadism
- Size: 25+ (2008)

Jaysh al-Ummah al-Salafi fi Bayt al-Maqdis (Arabic: جيش الأمة السلفي في بيت المقدس, lit. 'Salafi Army of the Ummah in Jerusalem'), also known as Jaysh al-Ummah fi Aknaf Bayt al-Maqdis (Arabic: جيش الأمة في أكناف بيت المقدس) or simply Jaysh al-Ummah (Arabic: جيش الأمة, lit. 'Army of the Ummah'), is a small Palestinian Salafi jihadist militant organization based in the Gaza Strip. The group is supportive of al-Qaeda and critical of Hamas.

== History ==
Members of Jaysh al-Ummah have claimed that their group was founded in 2005. However, researchers have dated its beginning instead to 2007 or 2008. Since its foundation, the group has mostly focused on shooting rockets and other explosives into Israeli territory. In January 2008, the group announced that it planned to murder United States President George W. Bush. On 1 September 2008, the group organized its first "public training session" in southern Gaza, using the opportunity to criticize Gaza's Hamas government. Two days later, Hamas arrested Jaysh al-Ummah's leader Abu Hafs al-Maqdisi, prompting the group to threaten violent responses unless their commander was released. Afterwards, the two sides became generally hostile, with Jaysh al-Ummah ignoring any ceasefire agreements agreed upon between Hamas and Israel, while Hamas would repeatedly arrest Jaysh al-Ummah members. However, the two groups refrained from open fighting. Jaysh al-Ummah fought in the 2012 Gaza War and the 2014 Gaza War against Israel.

In 2019, the group claimed responsibility for an attack on Israel. It also claimed to have taken part in the 2021 Israel–Palestine crisis, shooting rockets at Israeli targets.

The group reportedly fought in the Gaza war, launching rockets at Israeli territory and fighting against the Israeli invasion of the Gaza Strip.

== Organization ==
The group is relatively small. It had at least 25 members in 2008. Jaysh al-Ummah is led by Abu Hafs al-Maqdisi. It tries to finance itself through online donations via Bitcoin.

== Ideology ==
The group has described itself as Salafi jihadist force that aims for the implementation of the Sharia law in all Muslim communities and "liberating Palestine" as well as Al-Aqsa. Jaysh al-Ummah also expresses its hope that the Islamic caliphate is restored in the future. The group blames Jews for destroying the old caliphate, believing that they possess an innate "beastliness and barbarity". Accordingly, it is strongly anti-Israeli. Abu Hafs al-Maqdisi has claimed that the lack of a coherent vision among the Islamic ummah is the main reason for the failure to solve the "Palestinian case". He has argued that Muslims should unite to end the "Zionist-Crusader occupation" of Muslim countries, and blamed other Palestinian groups for having begun to serve "Western Zionist-Crusaders" and "Eastern Russian-Persian" projects instead of striving for the establishment of an Islamic state. It is critical of Iran's influence in the Gaza Strip, and has accused various Muslim countries such as Jordan, United Arab Emirates, and Saudi Arabia of helping the "war against Islam" by not opposing Israel.

=== Relations to other Islamist groups ===
Jaysh al-Ummah supports al-Qaeda, though it is not officially affiliated with it. Thabat, a media organization associated with al-Qaeda, is known to release statements by Jaysh al-Ummah. In contrast, Jaysh al-Ummah is opposed to the Islamic State (IS), and considers IS supporters "Khawarij". It has labelled IS a threat to the unity of jihadist factions in Gaza.

The group has a very tense relationship with Hamas. Since its foundation, Jaysh al-Ummah has criticized Hamas as being too moderate and not focused enough on Islamist projects. In turn, Hamas has repeatedly attempted to suppress Jaysh al-Ummah's activities. However, Jaysh al-Ummah has refrained from declaring Hamas un-Islamic, instead terming it a Muslim yet misguided movement. In regards to other Islamist groups such as the Palestinian Islamic Jihad, a member of Jaysh al-Ummah stated that the group "considers other Islamic movements to be brothers and respects and honours them". Jaysh al-Ummah also expressed support for Hamas and a wider alliance of Palestinian militias during the 2023 war.

== See also ==
- Salafi jihadist militant groups in the Gaza Strip
