= Comprador Colonialism =

The concept of comprador colonialism is academically vaguely defined and remains debated. It originates from the Portuguese term "Comprador" which translates into buyer, referring to agents of commercial enterprises based in Europe and North America and primarily operated in East, South, and Southeast Asia as well as Africa and South America. In the height of Western European Colonialism in the 19th and 20th centuries, the compradors emerged as a new class that acted as intermediaries for colonial powers or foreign capital. The new class profited from the colonial structure as it acted to strengthen foreign rather than national or local control over the political economy. During the 19th and 20th centuries, the comprador class became critical agents of global capitalism. By serving as so-called ‘Middlemen’ in the colonial enterprise, this new distinct bourgeoisie class enabled the development of imperial trade networks, negotiated the supply of labor that extracted profit from the local landscape, established new patterns of consumption and taste, and facilitated cultural as well as economic exchange that was critical to the growth of colonized cities. Scholars such as Robert Vitalis perceive the comprador and by extension the comprador bourgeoisie, as an important unit of analysis in studying economic and political change under colonialism and imperialism. These colonial agents, the compradors, integrated the local economies into the global capitalist system in a subordinate position by facilitating the exploitation of local resources, labor, and markets.

== Historical context ==
Comprador colonialism emerged as a significant phenomenon during the period of European colonial expansion, particularly in the 19th and early 20th centuries. It was deeply intertwined with the economic and political structures of colonialism, reflecting the complex dynamics between colonial powers and indigenous societies in colonized territories.

=== Colonial expansion and economic control ===
The intensification of European colonial expansion during the 19th and 20th centuries into various regions across the globe coincided with a steady rise in comprador colonialism. European powers established colonies in Asia, Africa, and the America's, exploiting the resources and labor of these territories to expand and fuel their industrial economies. The Compradors served as native agents or business partners of foreign investors who operated in some form in the local economy. In essence, the comprador embodies the core problem of the so-called peripheral political economy which is to exercise economic activity for the primary benefit of the imperial states. During the transition from colonialism to independence, compradors arose as local intermediaries who could facilitate economic transactions and manage colonial territories on behalf of the ruling powers. This new class and its close alliance with foreign capital paved the way toward neo-colonialism.

=== Economic exploitation and dependency ===
The compradors exerted significant economic power within the colonial territories, but their influence was dependent upon their alignment with the imperial state's interest. Often at the expense of the local population, the compradors facilitated the extraction of resources and wealth from the colonized regions. Many in this new colonial bourgeois class grew wealthy by trafficking in the commodities that were produced through the exploitations of both their adopted and native homes. This distinct class of the colonized territories enabled the further development of imperial trade networks that tied different colonial regions to the imperial metropolitan centers. The growth of modern cities in the imperial states was dependent on the comprador's negotiated supply of labor that extracted profit from the local landscape. Besides the other forms of economic and cultural exchange that were critical for the growth of the imperialist economy, the stratification of the colonies led to the establishment of new patterns of consumption and taste among the emerging comprador class. Furthermore, scholars such as Linda Tabar and Samia Al-Botmeh as well as Hubermann and Nasser highlight the intertwined dynamics of colonialism, neo-colonialism, neoliberalism, and settler colonialism in perpetuating economic exploitation and dispossession, the latter particularly evident in the case of Palestine. As Tabar and Al-Botmeh demonstrated, the city of Rawabi, the first planned Palestinian city, shows neoliberal modes of capital accumulation through land grabs and real estate development, leading to further entrenching precarity and class divisions.

=== Role of local intermediaries ===
The compradors often came from indigenous or local populations and played crucial roles as intermediaries between colonial authorities or foreign investors and the local economy. They served different roles in the colonial enterprise and acted as brokers, traders, and managers for foreign-owned businesses, thereby overseeing the production, distribution, and sale of goods within the colonial economy. Robert Vitalis highlights the dual role of compradors, by emphasizing their internalization of the basic theoretical problem of peripheral political economies, acting primarily for the benefit of foreign interests, while simultaneously keeping the influence of the imperialist state on certain economic sectors in the colonies in check.

=== Legacy and impact ===
The legacy of comprador colonialism continues to reverberate in post-colonial societies, shaping patterns of economic inequality, political power dynamics, and social hierarchies. The exploitation and marginalization experienced under comprador colonialism have fueled ongoing struggles for decolonization, economic justice, and self-determination in many parts of the world. In this regard, scholars such as Mosola argue that the failure to dismantle the colonial economy led to the emergence of neo-colonialism and the pursuit of economic policies that favored foreign capital. For example, loans and Foreign direct investment in Kenya have led to profit extraction and preserving the neo-colonial status. In addition to that, Sunil highlights that neo-colonialism is sustained through instruments such as economic policies, foreign aid, foreign capital, and trade. The struggle for independence in many Western colonies was tied to making compromises with the native comprador bourgeoisie and the colonizers. These compromises involved often to the keep the exploitive system as it is, leaving the peasants and workers in poverty. Mbeki further characterizes the nationalist struggles as efforts for inclusion within the capitalist order which was perpetuated by alliances between compradors, domestic business classes, and foreign capital.
