= Water supply and sanitation in Palestine =

Data
- Access to an at least basic water source: 91%
- Access to at least basic sanitation: 89%
- Share of collected wastewater treated: West Bank: 15% Gaza Strip: 62% (2001).
- Continuity of supply: 62.8% (2005)
- Average water use (L/person/day): West Bank: 50; Gaza strip: 70
- Average urban water and sanitation tariff (US$/m^{3}): 1.20
- Non-revenue water: 44%

Institutions
- Decentralization to municipalities: No
- National water and sanitation company: None
- Water and sanitation regulator: Palestinian Water Authority
- Responsibility for policy setting: Cabinet of ministries/National Water Council
- Sector law: Yes (2001)

The water resources of Palestine are de facto fully controlled by Israel, and the division of groundwater is subject to provisions in the Oslo II Accord.

Generally, the water quality is considerably worse in the Gaza Strip when compared to the West Bank. About a third to half of the delivered water in the Palestinian territories is lost in the distribution network. The lasting blockade of the Gaza Strip and the Gaza War (2008–2009) have caused severe damage to the infrastructure in the Gaza Strip. The blockade of water pipes is based on the admission by Hamas that they are repurposing pipes for use as launch tubes for rockets. Concerning wastewater, the existing treatment plants do not have the capacity to treat all of the produced wastewater, causing severe water pollution. The development of the sector highly depends on external financing.

== Overview ==
The region of Israel/Palestine is "water-stressed", like many other countries in the region, and macroanalysts consider working out how to share water resources the "single most important problem" for Middle Eastern peoples. One third of all water consumed in Israel was by the 1990s drawn from groundwater that in turn came from the rains over the West Bank, and the struggle over this resource has been described as a zero-sum game. According to Human Rights Watch Israel's confiscation of water violates the Hague Regulations of 1907, which prohibit an occupying power from expropriating the resources of occupied territory for its own benefit. In the wake of 1967, Israel abrogated Palestinian water rights in the West Bank, and with Military Order 92 of August of that year invested all power over water management to the military authority, though under international law Palestinians were entitled to a share. Both of Israel's own aquifers originate in West Bank territory and its northern cities would run dry without them. According to John Cooley, West Bank Palestinian farmers' wells, which in Ottoman, British, Jordanian and Egyptian law were a private resource owned by villages, were a key element behind Israel's post-1967 strategy to keep the area and in order to protect "Jewish water supplies" from what was considered "encroachment" (Note: "Keeping Tel Aviv, Haifa, and the other cities of the Israeli coastal plain from running dry depends on blocking Arab water development in the West Bank that could stop the aquifers flow westward: hence the ban on Arab wells".) many existing wells were blocked or sealed, Palestinians were forbidden to drill new wells without military authorization, which was almost impossible to obtain, and restrictive quotas on Palestinian water use were imposed. (Note: Military Order 158.44 Article 4(A) states that "it shall not be permissible for any person to set up or to assemble or to possess or to operate a water installation unless he has obtained a license from the area commander.") 527 known springs in the West Bank furnish (2010) Palestinians with half of their domestic consumption. The historic wells furnishing Palestinian villages have often been expropriated for the exclusive use of settlements: thus the major well servicing al-Eizariya was taken over by Ma'ale Adumim in the 1980s, while most of its land was stripped from them leaving the villagers with 2,979 of their original 11,179 dunams.

Most of the Israeli water carrier Mekorot's drillings in the West Bank are located in the Jordan Valley, where Palestinians ended up by 2008 drawing 44% less water than what they accessed before the Interim Agreement of 1995. Under those Oslo Accords Israel obtained 80% of the West Bank's waters, with the remaining 20% Palestinian, a percentage which, however, did not concede the Palestinians any "ownership right". Of their agreed on allocation for 2011 of 138.5 MCM, Palestinians managed to extract only 87 MCM, given the difficulties in obtaining Israeli permits, and the shortfall caused by the drying up of half of Palestinian wells has to be partially offset by buying water from Israel, with the net effect that per capita Palestinian water use has declined 20%. The World Health Organization's minimum consumption per capita of water is 100 litres per diem Model Palestinian new town urban developments, like the city of Rawabi, have been severely hampered by restrictions on their access to water.

In 2023, Israeli attacks on Palestinian water supplies both in the Gaza Strip and the West Bank amounted to roughly 25% of the 350 water conflicts which occurred that year globally. On average 7 such attacks, either by settlers or the army, resulting in either contaminated or destroyed water wells, pumps and irrigation systems, took place each month that year.

== History ==
Since the 1948 Arab–Israeli War, the issue of the development of the area's water resources, has been a critical issue in regional conflict and negotiations, initially involving Syria, Jordan and Israel. After the Six-Day War, when Israel occupied the Palestinian territories, water use and sanitation have been closely linked to developments in the Israeli–Palestinian conflict. The water and land resources in the West Bank in particular are considered to constitute the major obstacle to the resolution of conflict in the area. Palestinians claim they have a legal right to ownership, or claim to use of three water sources in the area:(a)the groundwater reservoir of the Mountain Aquifer, the Gaza Strip Coastal Aquifer and the Jordan River to the amount of 700 MCM/Y, over 50% of natural water resources between the Mediterranean Sea and the Jordan River.

In 1995, the Palestinian Water Authority (PWA) was established by a presidential decree. One year later, its functions, objectives and responsibilities were defined through a by-law, giving the PWA the mandate to manage water resources and execute the water policy.

During the Gaza war, the water system in the Gaza Strip was severely damaged, with half of its boreholes and desalination plants, and four of the six wastewater treatment plants, damaged or destroyed by May 2024.

== Water resources ==
=== Division in the Oslo II Accord ===
The 1995 Oslo II Accord allows the Palestinians in the West Bank the use of up to 118 million cubic meters (MCM) water per year. 80 MCM was supposed to come from newly-drilled wells. However, the PWA was able to drill new wells for only 30 MCM at the expense of the existing springs and wells. In the Oslo II Accord, the Israelis are allotted four times the Palestinian portion or 80% of the joint-aquifer resources. However, 94% (340 MCM) of the Western Aquifer was allotted to the Israelis for use within Israel. The allowed quantities have not been adapted after the end of the supposed five years interim period. The parties established the Joint Water Committee to carry out the provisions of the concerning article 40 of Annex III.

According to a World Bank report, Israel extracted 80% more water from the West Bank than agreed in the Oslo Accord, while Palestinian abstractions were within the agreed range. Contrary to expectations under Oslo II, the water actually extracted by Palestinians in the West Bank has dropped between 1999 and 2007. Due to the Israeli over-extraction, aquifer levels are near ″the point where irreversible damage is done to the aquifer.″ Israeli wells in the West Bank have dried up local Palestinian wells and springs.

=== Water from the Jordan River basin ===
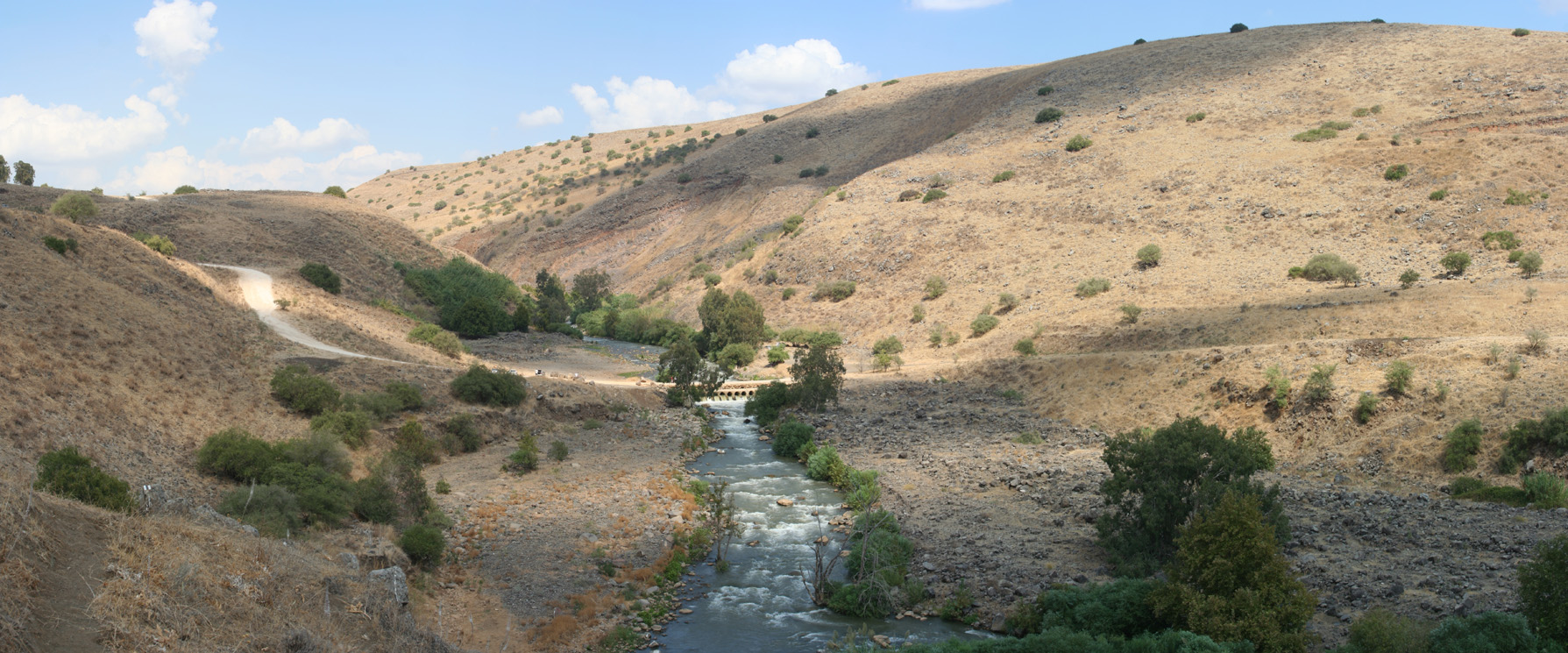
Jordan River

The Upper Jordan River flows south into the Sea of Galilee, which provides the largest freshwater storage capacity along the Jordan River. Lake Tiberias drains into the Lower Jordan River, which winds further south through the Jordan Valley to its terminus in the Dead Sea. The Palestinians are denied any access to this water. About a quarter of the 420 million m^{3} Israel pumps from the Sea of Galilee goes to the local communities in Israel and to Jordan; the rest is diverted to Israel through the National Water Carrier (NWC) before it can reach the West Bank. Virtually all water from the Yarmouk River, north of the West Bank is diverted by Israel, Syria and Jordan. The water of the Tirza Stream, the largest stream in the central Jordan Valley, fed by rainwater, is diverted by Israel to the Tirza Reservoir and used by settlements in the area for irrigation of crops and for raising fish.

=== Other surface water ===
In Gaza, the only source of surface water has been the Wadi Gaza. There are claims that Israel diverts part of its water for agricultural purposes within Israel prior to its arrival to Gaza.

=== Groundwater ===
In the West Bank, the main groundwater resource is the Mountain Aquifer, which consists of three aquifers: Before the Israeli occupation of the West Bank Israel drew 60% of the water extracted from aquifers straddling the border between it and the West Bank. It now takes 80%, which overall means that 40% of Israel's water comes from West Bank aquifers.

- The Western Aquifer, in Israel called the "Yarkon-Taninim Aquifer", is the largest one, with an annual safe yield of 362 million cubic metres (MCM), based on average annual estimate, (of which 40 MCM are brackish). Eighty percent of the recharge area of this basin is located within the West Bank, whereas 80% of the storage area is located within Israeli borders. Israelis exploit the aquifers of this basin by means of 300 deep groundwater wells to the west of the Green Line, as well as by deep wells within the West Bank boundary. Palestinians who have access to pre-existing wells and springs may draw on them, but are, as opposed to Israeli settlements, are forbidden to drill new wells.
- The North-Eastern Aquifer, in Israel called the "Gilboa-Bet She'an Aquifer" or "Schechem-Gilboa Aquifer", has an annual safe yield of 145 MCM (of which 70 MCM are brackish). Almost 100% of its water comes from precipitation falling within the West Bank area, but then flows underground in a northerly direction into the Bisan (Bet She'an) and Jezreel valley.
- The Eastern Aquifer, entirely within the West Bank, has an annual safe yield of 172 MCM (of which 70–80 MCM are brackish). This aquifer is mainly drained by springs.

According to Hiniker, at an average sustainable rate, the amount of renewable shared freshwater available throughout the entire Jordan Valley is roughly 2700 MCM per year, which is composed of 1400 million cubic metres of groundwater and 1300 million cubic metres of surface water. However, only a fraction of this can be used by Palestinians in the West Bank. Israel has denied Palestinians access to the entire Lower Jordan River since 1967. After the start of Israel's military occupation in 1967, Israel declared the West Bank land adjacent to the Jordan River a closed military zone, to which only Israeli settler farmers have been permitted access.

In 1982, the West Bank water infrastructure controlled by the Israeli army was handed over to the Israeli national water company Mekorot. As of 2009, Mekorot operates some 42 wells in the West Bank, mainly in the Jordan Valley region, which mostly supply the Israeli settlements. The amount of water Mekorot can sell to the Palestinians is subject to approval of the Israeli authorities.

Drilling of wells into the mountain aquifer by the Palestinians is restricted. Most of its water thus flows underground towards the slopes of the hills and into Israeli territory. According to different estimates, between 80 and 85% of groundwater in the West Bank is used either by Israeli settlers or flows into Israel.

The Coastal Aquifer is the only groundwater source in the Gaza strip. It runs beneath the coast of Israel, with Gaza downstream at the end of the basin. With the water flows underground mainly east–west, however, Palestinian extractions from the aquifer have no effect on the Israeli side. Israel, on the contrary, has installed a cordon of numerous deep wells along the Gaza border and in this way extracts much of the groundwater before it can reach Gaza. Israel sells a limited part of the water to the Palestinians in Gaza. While Israel transports water from the north of its territory to the south, the Palestinians are not allowed to move water from the West Bank to Gaza. This is a reason why this aquifer is heavily over-exploited, resulting in seawater intrusion. The aquifer is polluted by salt as well as nitrate from wastewater infiltration and fertilizers. Only 5-10% of the aquifer yields drinking water quality. By 2000, the water from the Coastal Aquifer in the Gaza region was considered no longer drinkable due to high salinity from the sea water intrusion and high nitrate pollution from agricultural activity. In 2013, an analysis of nine municipal groundwater wells reported a TDS ranging from 680.4 mg/L to 3106.6 mg/L, averaging 1996.5 mg/L, exceeding the 1000 mg/L WHO acceptable level, mainly due to high chloride and sodium.

Pursuant Oslo II (Annex III, Article 40.7), Israel committed itself to sell 5 MCM/year to the Gaza Strip. In 2015 Israel had doubled the amount to 10 MCM/year. Gaza also imports water, or produces drinkwater by means of desalination plants.

=== Desalination of brackish groundwater ===
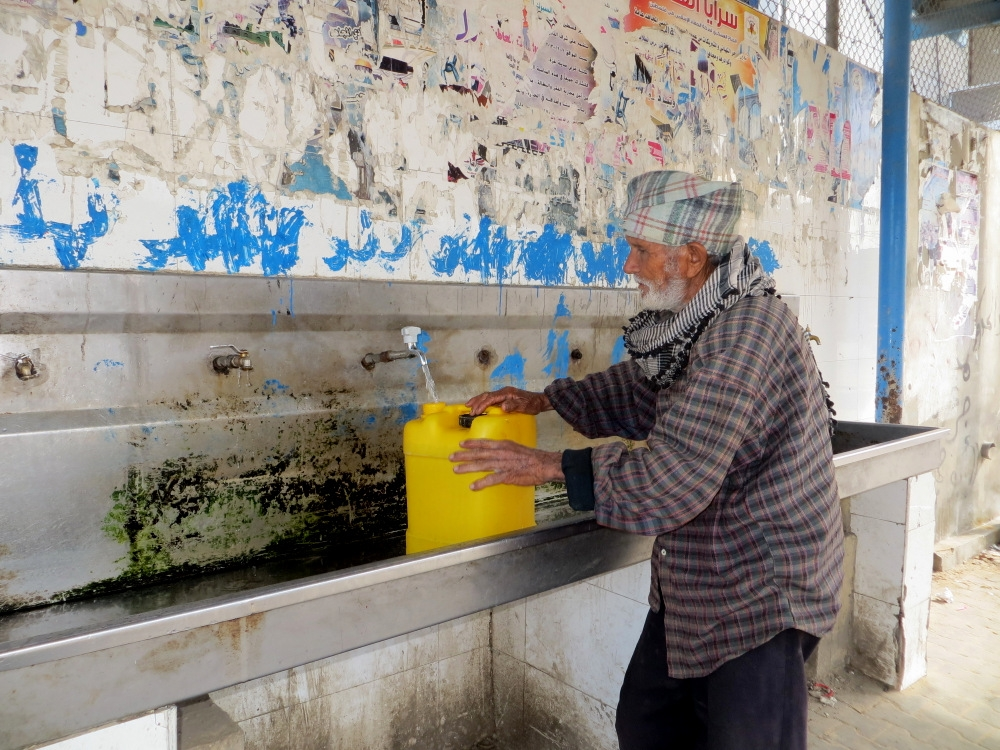
An elderly man fills a water container at a public multi-faucet sink in Khan Younis, Gaza Strip.

In Gaza, desalinated brackish groundwater has become an important source of drinking water. Over 20,000 consumers in over 50% of the Gaza households have installed domestic 'reverse osmosis' (RO) units to desalinate water for drinking purposes. The water quality is high, though the water lacks basic minerals. As of January 2014, there were 18 neighborhood desalination plants in the Gaza strip, providing safe drinking water for free to 95,000 people who come to fill their canisters at the plants. 13 of these plants are operated by UNICEF.

In 2009, approximately 100 industrial desalination plants were operational. Due to the Israeli blockade of the Gaza Strip, the import of spare parts—essential to operate the desalination plants of industry, communities and households—as well as necessary chemicals, is problematic.

=== Desalinated seawater ===
As of 2007, there was one seawater desalination plant in Deir al-Balah in the Gaza Strip, built in 1997–99 with funding by the Austrian government. It has a capacity of 600 cubic metres (21,000 cu ft) per day and it is owned and operated by the Coastal Municipalities Water Utility. At least initially, the operating costs were subsidized by the Austrian government. The desalinated water is distributed to 13 water kiosks.

For over 20 years, a major desalination plant for Gaza has been discussed. The Palestinian Water Authority has approved a $500 million facility. The New York Times reported in 2013 that Israel supported this and had begun to offer Palestinians desalination training. In 2012 the French government committed a 10 million-euro grant for the plant. Arab countries, coordinated by the Islamic Development Bank, committed to provide half of the necessary funds, matching an expected European financial commitment. The European Investment Bank provides technical assistance.

Another major problem is that desalination is very energy-intensive, while the import of fuel to produce the necessary electricity is restricted by Israel and Egypt. Furthermore, revenues from drinking water tariffs are insufficient to cover the operating costs of the envisaged plant at the current tariff level.

=== Rainwater collection ===
In the West Bank, collection of rainwater is a very limited resource in addition to tanker truck water for Palestinians who lack connection to the water grid, notably in rural areas. However, Israeli authorities control even the collection of small quantities of rainwater. According to the 2009 report Troubled Waters by Amnesty International, some 180,000–200,000 Palestinians living in rural communities have no access to running water and the Israeli army often prevents them from even collecting rainwater. The Israeli army frequently destroys small rainwater harvesting cisterns built by Palestinian communities who have no access to running water, or prevents their construction.

=== Water reuse ===
In view of the limited availability of water resources, water reuse is seen as an important source. In the West Bank, Israel collects wastewater in two facilities in the Jordan Valley. Not only wastewater from Israelis in Jerusalem and settlements is collected, but also from Palestinians. All recycled water is used for irrigation in settlements in the Jordan Valley and northern Dead Sea area.

== Water use ==
=== Palestinians ===
As of 2007, the estimated average per capita supply in the West Bank had increased to about 98 liter per capita per day (98 lpcd). The estimated household use was 50 lpcd, with many households consuming as little as 20 lpcd, even if connected to the network. Due to the settlement of areas in the West Bank and its resultant fragmentation, movement of water from water-rich areas to Palestinian communities with water shortage is inhibited. Therefore, there are huge differences in water use in the eastern and southern West Bank. While the daily consumption in the Jericho district was 161 liters in 2009, in Jericho city even 225 liters, it was less than 100 liters in other areas. In the central Jordan Valley it was about 60 liters. Inhabitants of a-Nu’ima, east of Jericho, had only 24 liters. Residents of villages that are cut off from water supply have to buy water from watertanker operators. All of the eastern West Bank, except the Israeli settlements and Jericho are designated as a closed military area or as an area that for other reasons has access restrictions for Palestinians. In 2012, 90% of the small Palestinian communities living there had less than 60 lpcd. Over half of them, mostly Bedouin or herding communities, often cut off from their traditional wells, had even less than 30 litres per person per day.

As of 2009, the Palestinian Water Authority (PWA) or municipalities provided about 70 lpcd in Gaza, but could not reach all households.

For 2012, the Palestinian Central Bureau of Statistics (PCBS) provided the following figures (domestic use):

	Population	Supplied *	Consumed *	Lost *	use per head **
West Bank ^{1)}	2,435,338	93.9 MCM ^{2)}	67.9 MCM ^{2)}	26.0 MCM	76.4 lpcd ^{2)}
Gaza Strip	1,672,865	106.0 MCM	54.7 MCM	51.3 MCM	89.5 lpcd
Totals	4,108,203	199.9 MCM	122.6 MCM	77.3 MCM	81.7 lpcd

* MCM=million cubic meters per year
** lpcd=liter per capita per day
^{1)} excl. East Jerusalem
^{2)} including commercial and industrial uses; hence, the actual supply and consumption rates per capita are less than the indicated numbers; 93.9 MCM=105.6 lpcd and 67.9 MCM=76.4 lpcd (for given population over 365 days)

In 2012, about 44% of the groundwater was for use in agriculture. Industrial use was only 3% in 2005.

The household use is less than the supply, which includes industrial, commercial and public consumption as well as losses. In the Gaza strip, for example, the estimated average per capita supply in 2005 was 152 lpcd, but due to high network losses, the actual water use was only 60% of it, which would be about 91 liter. The minimum quantity for domestic use, recommended by the WHO is 100 lpcd.

=== Israeli settlers ===
In 2008, the settlements in the Jordan Valley and northern Dead Sea area were allocated 44.8 million m^{3} (MCM) of water, 97.5 percent of which (43.7 MCM) were for agricultural use. Seventy percent of it was provided by Mekorot. According to Israeli figures, the household use of settlers in the Jordan Valley was 487 liters per capita per day (lpcd) and in the northern Dead Sea area even 727 lpcd. That is three to four times the use of 165 liters in Israel. As the settlers in the eastern West Bank use nearly all the water use for agriculture, they in fact export water from the Palestinian Territories.

In 2009, settlers in Pnei Hever, Hebron District, consumed 194 liters per day; those in Efrat, east of Bethlehem, 217 liters.

=== Water use of Israelis versus Palestinians ===
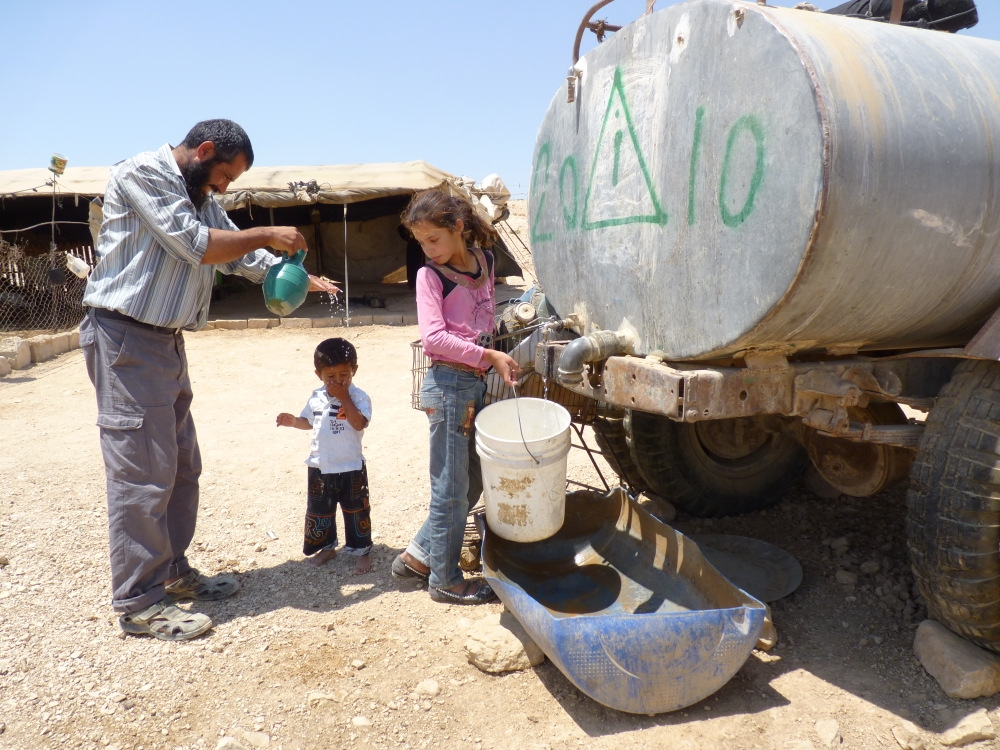
Bedouins purchase water from water trucks in Khirbet A-Duqaiqah in the South Hebron Hills near the Green Line, a village with 300 residents that is not hooked up to water grid.

According to the Palestinian Water Authority, the average Israeli consumption of water is 300 liter per person per day, which is more than 4 times that of the Palestinian use of 72 liters per day. Some Palestinian village communities live on even less water than the average Palestinian consumption, in some cases no more than 20 liters per person per day. According to the World Bank, water extractions per capita for West Bank Palestinians are about one quarter of those for Israelis, and have declined over the last decade. In 1999, Palestinians in the West Bank used only 190 lpcd from the West Bank resources, the settlers 870 lpcd, and the Israelis used even 1,000 lpcd. Israeli settlers in the West Bank thus used about 4.5 times the amount of water available to the Palestinians.

In 2008, the settlers in the Niran settlement, north of Jericho, used more than 5 times the amount of the nearby Palestinian village al-A’uja. The Argaman settlement, in the central Jordan Valley, used more than 5 times the amount of the adjacent Palestinian village a-Zubeidat. The household use in the Ro’i settlement, in the northern Jordan Valley, was per head 21 times that of the adjacent Bedouin community al-Hadidya, which is not connected to the regular water supply.

In 2009, the settlers in Efrat consumed, with 217 liters, three times the amount of the per capita use of 71 liters in the nearby Palestinian Bethlehem Governorate.

While many Palestinians living in rural communities have no access to running water, Israeli settlers who export their products have irrigated farms, lush gardens and swimming pools. The 450,000 settlers use as much or even more water than all 2.3 million Palestinians together. Many Palestinians have to buy water from Israel, of often dubious quality, delivered with tanker trucks at very high prices. Water tankers are forced to take long detours to avoid Israeli military checkpoints and roads which are out of bounds to Palestinians, resulting in steep increases in the price of water.

== Infrastructure ==
=== Connection to the water grid ===
According to the Joint Monitoring Program (JMP) of the World Health Organization (WHO) and UNICEF, about 90% of the Palestinians in the Territories had access to an improved water source.

A survey carried out by the Palestinian Central Bureau of Statistics (PCBS) found that the number of households in the Palestinian territories connected to the water network was 91.8% in 2011. In the West Bank, 89.4% of the households were connected while the connection share in the Gaza Strip was 96.3%.

According to a 2004 study by Karen Assaf, there are low service levels especially in small villages and refugee camps. The gap between urban and rural areas concerning water supply house connections may be due to the fact that available water resources are not accessible for the Palestinian actors in many cases. In 42% of the localities, water supply got uninterrupted; 19% received it at least partially. Furthermore, about 40% of all served localities suffer from water shortages.

The Euro-Mediterranean Water Information System (EMWIS) states that continuity in the Palestinian territories is 62.8%

=== Water cisterns ===
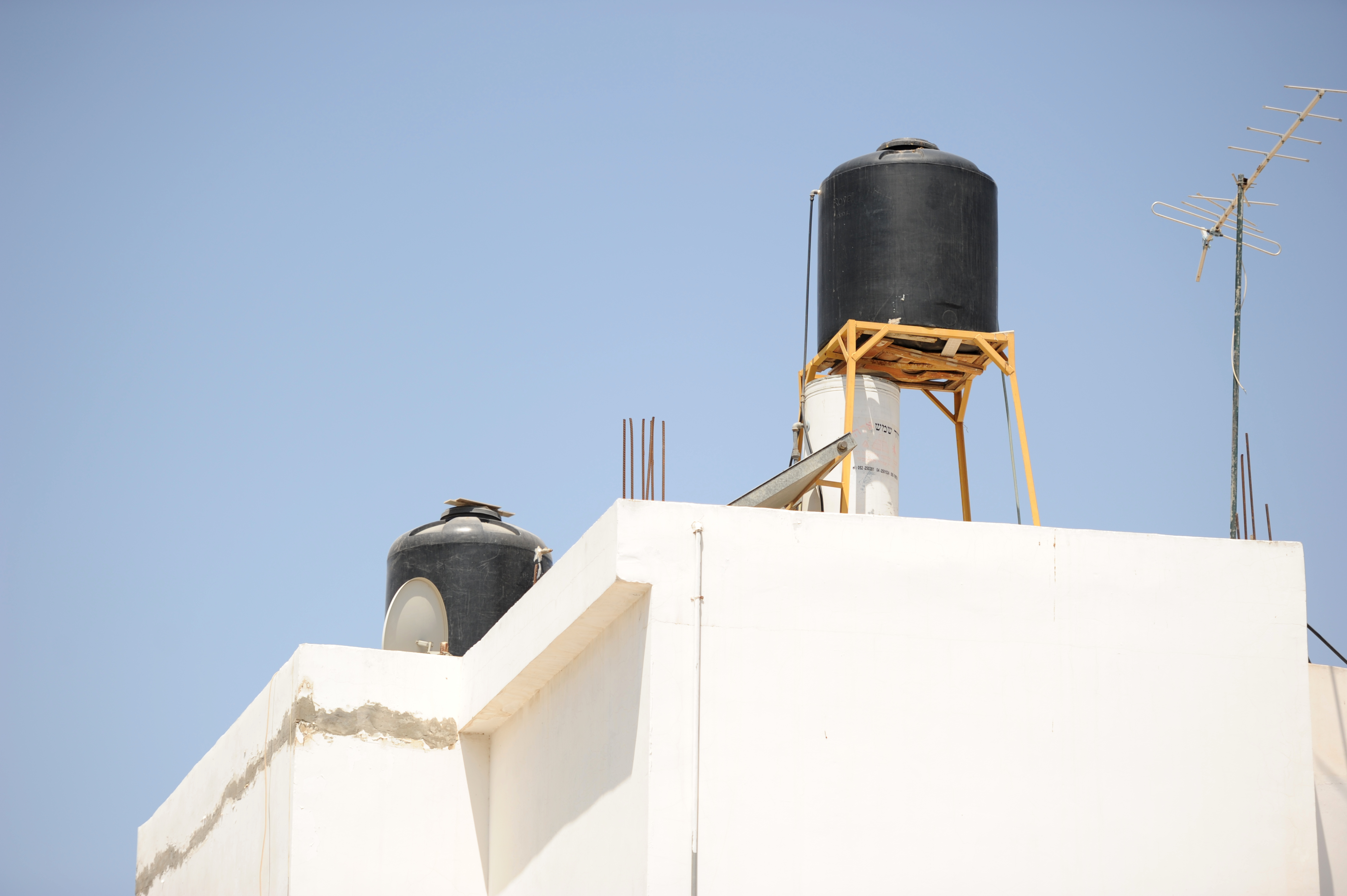
Roof water cistern in Jenin

Due to unreliable water delivery, virtually every Palestinian house has at least one, most several, water cisterns to store water. In the West Bank, the management of water resources is subject to debate due to military regulations.

=== Drinking water quality ===
Data of a survey carried out in 2011 revealed that 47.2% of the households in the Palestinian Territories consider the water quality as good. The share is significantly higher in the West Bank (70.9%) than in the Gaza Strip (5.3%). Compared to an earlier study, the results indicate that the percentage of households which consider the water quality as good decreased from 67.5% in 1999.

A 2013 water analysis study conducted in the central region of Gaza revealed that 74% of the water samples from distribution points had varying degrees of microbiological contamination. Specifically, 26% of the samples had a moderate contamination level, between 11 and 100 colonies per 100 ml, and 13% had high levels of contamination, exceeding 100 total coliform colonies per 100 ml.

=== Water losses and sewage problems ===
In 2012, the losses of water in the network were estimated some 28% in the West Bank and even half of the supplied amount in Gaza. In the West Bank, construction and maintenance of water and sewage infrastructure are problematic. The Palestinian areas are enclaves in the Israeli-controlled Area C. Therefore, all projects are subject to approval of the Joint Water Committee and the Israeli army. In Gaza, the infrastructure is subject to periodic large-scale destruction by Israeli attacks, such as in the 2004 Raid on Beit Hanoun, or the 2008/2009 Operation Cast Lead. The groundwater in Gaza is highly contaminated by leaked sewage.

The high water loss rates are ascribed to illegal connections, worn out pipe systems in the networks, and utility dysfunction. Especially in the Gaza Strip, high losses are caused by illegal connections. Illegal use of water is often the result of water shortages and insufficient supply. Furthermore, the conditions of water supply utilities suffer from grave deficiencies causing high leakage rates and a weak water pulse in the system, ascribed to both institutional weakness and the restrictions posed by the occupation on the development of the water and sanitation sectors, including the Gaza blockade.

=== Effects of the Gaza war and the Gaza blockade ===
Following the 2008–2009 Israel–Gaza conflict, the World Bank reported severe damages to the water and sanitation infrastructure in the Gaza Strip. Almost all sewage and water pumps were out of operation due to a lack of electricity and fuel. Spare parts and other maintenance supplies were in urgent need to be replenished. This situation resulted in a serious shortage of water and sewage overflows in urban areas, posing a threat to public health.

The Israeli blockade of the Gaza Strip impedes the provision of spare parts and thus contributes to exacerbate the problem. Several aid agencies and the top United Nations humanitarian official in the Palestinian territories therefore demanded the immediate opening of crossings. According to the United Nations, about 60% of the population in the Gaza Strip did not have access to continuous water supply in 2009.

== Effects of the Gaza war ==
Before the Gaza war, 26 percent of diseases observed in Gaza were water-related. On the eve of the war (6 October 2023), Gaza had 5 wastewater treatment plants, and 65 sewage pumping stations. Gaza's only one of Gaza's three desalisation plants was operational given the ongoing Israeli blockade of fuel and electricity.

In November 2023, Israeli airstrikes partially destroyed infrastructure providing energy for the Gaza Central wastewater treatment plant, affecting 1 million people. The airstrikes led to a 95% reduction of water resources available to the population of the Strip, with the consequence that Gazans were limited to 3 litres per day, 12 litres under the UN emergency limit. By late April 2024, 63% of all water and sanitation infrastructure in Gaza had been significantly damaged, with the Rafah Governorate an exception at 6%. Following Israel's Rafah offensive, damage to its water-related infrastructure rose 24.5%.

In July 2025, Gaza was facing a severe water crisis, worsened by bombings and fuel shortages that have crippled infrastructure. According to a recent report by the UN humanitarian agency OCHA, Gaza's ongoing lack of clean water—after 21 months of war and four months of blockade—was already having severe consequences for public health. Many residents must walk long distances in extreme heat to collect a few liters of drinking water, enduring constant thirst amid the destruction. Pregnant women often lived in overcrowded shelters with little access to clean water or medical care, leaving high-risk pregnancies undetected. Journalists reported widespread illness and exhaustion due to hunger and dehydration. Oxfam warned of a sharp rise in waterborne diseases and a looming humanitarian disaster if urgent action was not taken.

== Wastewater treatment ==
About 90% of the Palestinians in the Territories had access to improved sanitation in 2008. Cesspits were used by 39% of households, while access to the sewer network increased to 55% in 2011, up from 39% in 1999.

In the Gaza strip, from the 110,000 m^{3} of wastewater per day which is produced in the Gaza Strip, 68,000 m^{3} was treated, according to a study from 2001. 20% of the treated wastewater was reused. The World Bank reported in 2009 that the three existing wastewater treatment plants work discontinuously. Damaged sewage infrastructure can often not be repaired due to the ongoing Israeli blockade. It leads to delays in repairs and a lack of electricity and fuel which would be necessary to operate the wastewater treatment facilities. The United Nations estimate that per day 50,000 to 80,000 cubic meters of untreated and partially treated wastewater are discharged into the Mediterranean Sea since January 2008, threatening the environment in the region.

In the West Bank, only 13,000 out of 85,000 m^{3} of wastewater were treated in five municipal wastewater treatment plants in Hebron, Jenin, Ramallah, Tulkarem and Al-Bireh. The Al Bireh plant was constructed in 2000 with funding by the German aid agency KfW. According to the World Bank report, the other four plants perform poorly concerning efficiency and quality.

== Responsibility for water supply and sanitation ==
=== Relevant laws ===
The current sector legislation was established after the 1995 Oslo Accords, with a by-law establishing the Palestinian Water Authority (PWA) in 1996, a 1998 Water Resources Management Strategy and the 2002 water law. The Water Law of 2002 clarifies the responsibilities of the Palestinian Water Authority (PWA) and establishes a National Water Council (NWC) with the task to set national water policies. It also establishes "national water utilities".

=== Policy and regulation ===
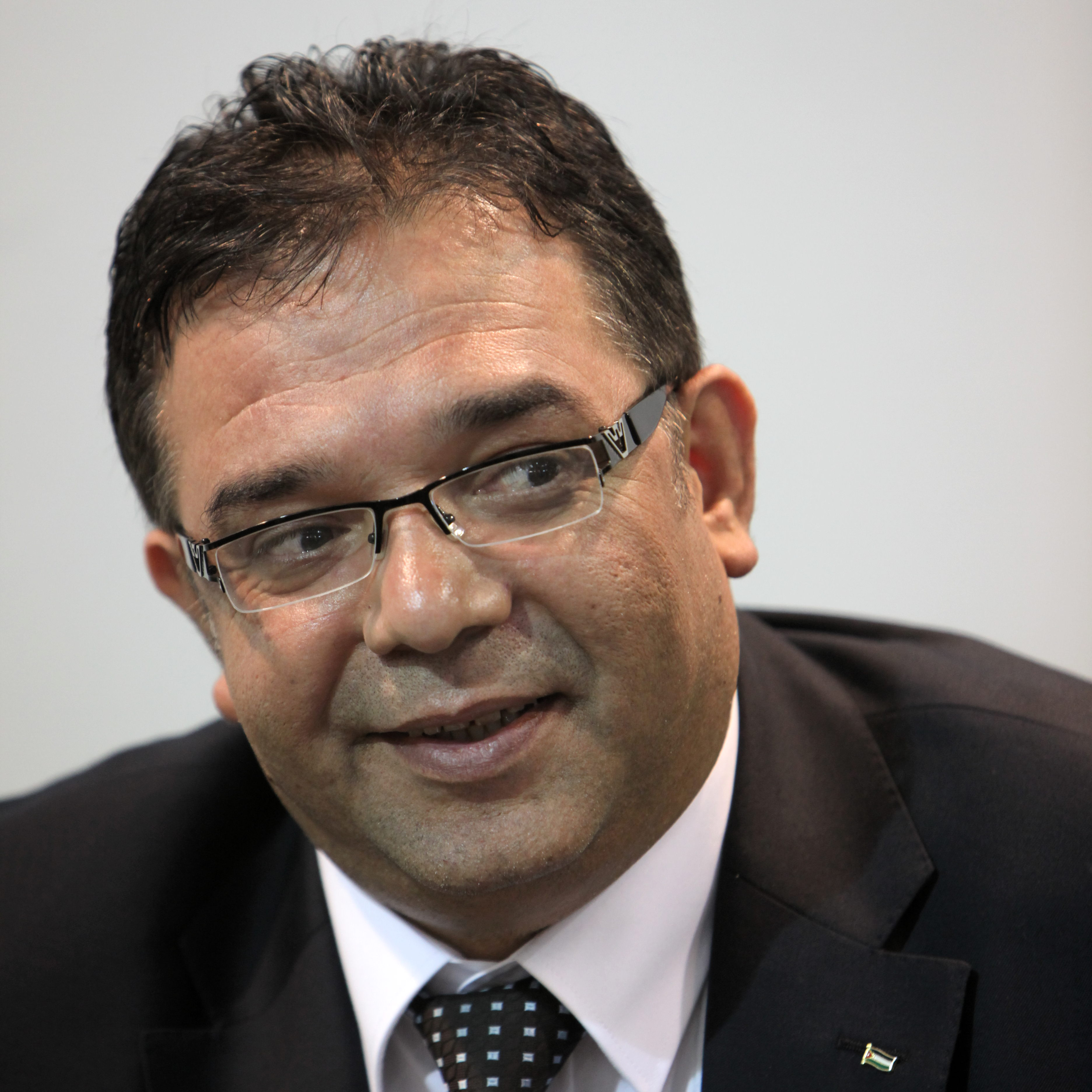
Shaddad Attili, Head of the Palestinian Water Authority from 2008 until 2014 at the 6th World Water Forum in Marseille, 2012.

General water sector policies are set by the Palestinian cabinet of ministries and the National Water Council (NWC). The council has the authority to suspend or dismantle the services of the board of directors of the regional water and wastewater services providers. The members of the council include the main Palestinian ministries. The Palestinian Water Authority (PWA) acts as regulatory authority, responsible for the legislation, monitoring and human resources development in the sector. The PWA is also in charge of water resources management. It has the mandate to carry out regular inspections and to keep a register of all water related data and information. The authority shares responsibility for irrigation with the Ministry of Agriculture (MoA) and for environmental protection with the Environment Quality Authority (EQA).

==== The Joint Water Committee ====
As part of the 1995 Interim Agreement, a Joint Water Committee (JWC) has been established between Israel and the Palestinian territories. The JWC was expected to implement the regulations of article 40 of the agreement which concern water and sanitation. The committee is composed of an equal number of participants by the two parties and all decisions need consensus, which means that each side has a veto. The JWC is not independent from Israel and the PA. Instead, decisions can be passed to a higher political level. Jägerskog reports several delays concerning the implementation of Palestinian project proposals within the committee, partly due to missing Palestinian funding, time-consuming approval procedures, hydrological and political reasons.

=== Service provision ===
The Water Law No. 3 provided the legal basis for the establishment of "national water utilities". The PWA's goal is to establish four regional utilities, one in Gaza and three in the West Bank (North, Center and South). However, in reality as of 2011 only the regional utility for Gaza has been established.

West Bank. Water services in the West Bank continue to be provided by municipalities, two multi-municipal utilities and village councils. The largest and oldest multi-municipal utility in the West Bank is the Jerusalem Water Undertaking (JWU) in the Ramallah and Al-Bireh area. JWU, founded in 1966 when the West Bank was still part of Jordan, serves the two cities as well as 10 smaller towns, more than 43 villages and 5 refugee camps. A second much smaller multi-municipal utility is the Water Supply and Sewerage Authority (WSSA) that serves Bethlehem and the neighboring towns Beit Jala and Beit Sahour. In other cities such as Tulkarem, Qalqilya, Nablus, Jenin, Jericho and Hebron as well as in small towns, municipalities provide water and - if existing - sewer services. Both utilities and municipalities depend to a varying extent on bulk water supply by the Israeli water company Mekorot, which delivers about 80% of the water used by JWU. In rural areas, water is provided by Village Council water departments. In the North-Eastern Jenin area a Joint Service Council (JSC) formed by six villages provides water.

Gaza strip In all 25 municipalities in the Gaza strip, water provision is the responsibility of the Coastal Municipalities Water Utility (CMWU). However, the utility is still in the process of being set up and exercise its legal tasks. The intended procedure is that the municipalities receive technical assistance by the CMWU and gradually transfer their staff and assets to it. According to the World Bank, this model led to some improvements like faster repair of leakage and economies of scale. However, the plan is far from being fully implemented. The model experienced serious problems which are mainly caused by the unstable political conditions in the Gaza strip since 2008, including differences between municipalities governed by Hamas and Fatah, so that some municipalities refused to transfer their assets and staff to CMWU.

=== Non-governmental organizations and universities ===
Non-governmental organisations (NGOs) are very active in the field of water and wastewater treatment and reuse. One NGO network is the Palestinian Environmental NGOs Network (PENGON) that was initiated after the 2000 al-Aqsa Intifada. It has more than 20 members, including NGOs, universities and research centers.

=== Private sector participation ===
Two management contracts were awarded for Gaza in 1996 and for the Bethlehem area in 1999. In 2002, soon after the outbreak of the Second Intifada, the Bethlehem contract was terminated and the Gaza contract expired.

In Gaza, a four-year management contract was awarded to a joint venture of Lyonnaise des Eaux (now Suez) and Khatib and Alami in 1996. The contract was entirely funded by a US$25 million World Bank credit. According to a 1998 World Bank paper, water quality improved since the contract became active. Furthermore, water losses fell and water consumption and revenues rose. However, actual responsibility for service provision remained with municipalities. When the contract ended in 2000, it was renewed twice for one year until 2002. The World Bank reports that from 1996 to 2002, 16,000 illegal connections have been identified and more than 1,900 km of pipes have been observed for leakage. Moreover, 22,000 connections have been replaced, more than 20 km of pipes have been repaired and more than 30,000 water meters have been replaced. The amount of non-revenue water (NRW) decreased to about 30%. After the end of the contract, the Coastal Municipal Water Utility (CMWU) has been established to manage water and sanitation in the Gaza strip.

Another management contract was awarded in 1999 covering water supply of about 600,000 people in the governorates of Bethlehem and Hebron, with a focus on the former one. The contract was awarded to a joint venture of the French Vivendi and the Lebanese-Palestinian company Khatib and Alami. Among other things, it included the improvement of infrastructure and billing procedures. The contract was financed with a credit of US$21 million, while the European Investment Bank (EIB) provided US$35.7 million. Mainly due to the continuing hostilities and the premature cancellation of EIB support, the World Bank rates the total outcome of the project as unsatisfactory. According to the World Bank, non-revenue water was reduced from about 50% to 24% in Hebron and only 10% in Bethlehem in 2004. Illegal connections were eliminated in Hebron and more than halved in Bethlehem.

== Efficiency ==
About half (44%) of the produced water is non-revenue water (NRW), water which is not billed due to leakage or water theft. The share varies widely from 25% in Ramallah to 65% in Jericho. In the Gaza Strip, NRW is estimated to be about 45%, out of which 40% is caused by physical losses and 5% by unregistered connections and meter losses. For comparison leakage of water at Israeli municipal pipes amount to about 10% of water usage.

== Financial aspects ==
=== Tariffs and cost recovery ===
A water-pricing policy is under preparation. Currently, increasing block tariffs are applied in the Palestinian territories. There is no price differentiation according to the purpose (residential, commercial, industrial). The average cost of water supply is $22 per month ($25 in the West Bank and $10 in Gaza). Karen Assaf reported an average tariff of US$1.20 (5 NIS) per m^{3} in 2004. In areas where piped water is not available, water is purchased from water tankers for prices five to six times higher than for piped water. The long-term objective to recover water production costs, or at least operation and maintenance costs, is still not reached.

The following table gives an overview of the distribution of households in the Palestinian Territories by the cost of monthly consumed water in 2003.

Distribution of water consumption
Cost of monthly consumed water (US$)	%
Less than 25	69.4%
25–50	15.1%
50–75	5.9%
75–100	2.8%
more than 100	6.8%

Bill collection rates average 50% in the West Bank and only 20% in Gaza.

=== Investment and financing ===
The PWA issues periodic reports including information about projects and donor contributions. In the West Bank, the total investment cost of water projects from 1996 to 2002 amounted to about US$500 million, out of which 150 million were already spent on completed projects. The costs of ongoing projects were US$300 million, and the remaining US$50 million were committed to future projects. Out of the total cost of US$500 million, 200 million were invested in the water supply sector and 130 million in the wastewater sector. The remaining financial resources were spent in water conservation (80m), institutional and capacity building (30m), storm water, water resources and irrigation systems.

At the same time, the total investment costs of water projects in the Gaza Strip were about US$230 million, out of which most was spent on ongoing projects (US$170 million), while the remaining 60 million were implemented costs. About 90% of these investments were financed by grants and 10% by loans from the European Investment Bank (EIB) and the World Bank. US$100 million were invested in the water sector and 40 million in the wastewater sector.

It is estimated that a future investment of about US$1.1 billion for the West Bank and US$0.8 billion is needed for the planning period from 2003 to 2015.

== External cooperation ==
About 15 bilateral and multilateral donor agencies support the Palestinian water sector. In 2006, the PWA complained that coordination between PWA and donors was "still not successful" and that some donors and NGOs were "bypassing" the PWA. Donor coordination mechanisms in the sector include Emergency Water, Sanitation and Hygiene group (EWASH) regrouping UN agencies and NGOs as well as Emergency Water Operations Center (EWOC) led by USAID. Both were established to coordinate the reconstruction after the 2002 Israeli incursions into the West Bank.

=== European Union ===
The European Investment Bank (EIB) provided loan funding for refurbishing water reservoirs and was expected to fund the construction of the south regional wastewater treatment plant and a section of the north–south municipal water carrier in Gaza. Within the framework of the Facility for Euro-Mediterranean Investment and Partnership (FEMIP), the EIB financed operations with more than 137 million Euro in the West Bank and Gaza between 1995 and 2010. 10% of the funds were allocated to the water and environment sector.

=== France ===
The French development agency, Agence française de développement (AFD), supports several projects in the Palestinian territories. For example, AFD finances the connection of densely populated areas of Rafah to the sewage system, the construction of water pipes and reservoirs in Hebron, and the construction of a water distribution network in six villages in the district of Jenin.

=== Germany ===
German development cooperation has been engaged in the water and sanitation sector in the Palestinian Territories since 1994. It consists of financial cooperation through KfW and technical cooperation through GIZ, both working on behalf of the German Ministry for Economic Cooperation and Development.

KfW is engaged in Nablus, Tulkarem, Salfit, Ramallah / Al-Bireh, Jenin and Gaza City. The water supply activities focus on the reduction of non-revenue water so that the available water resources can be used more efficiently. One successful example of water loss reduction is the first phase of the KfW-supported program in Nablus: the frequency of supply for 8,000 inhabitants in the Rafidia neighbourhood was increased from every 4 days to every 2–3 days. This was achieved by reducing distribution losses from 40% to currently 30%. Sanitation activities include the construction of sewer networks and wastewater treatment. The town of Al Bireh had the only functioning wastewater treatment plant in the West Bank in 2009. The plant, which was funded by KfW, was commissioned in 2000 and operates in a satisfactory way despite the challenging environment of the West Bank. The construction of wastewater treatment plants in Gaza City, Western Nablus, Salfeet and the Tulkarem region, however, was substantially delayed as of 2009. Until 2008 new financial cooperation commitments were granted in the form of projects that identified specific investments at an early stage. This approach changed in 2008 with the approval of a new KfW-supported water and sanitation program for the West Bank and Gaza. This program is open for proposals from small and medium-sized towns if they comply with certain selection criteria. The program's main focus is on water loss reduction.

Outcomes of technical cooperation include improved performance for the Jerusalem Water Undertaking, the utility serving Ramallah, as a result of capacity building and training. Employees of the municipality Al-Bireh were trained in operating the town's wastewater treatment plant. Wells have been drilled or rehabilitated in the Nablus and Ramallah area, supplying 120,000 people with drinking water. GTZ also supported the creation of the National Water Council in 2006. Furthermore, at least 6,000 schoolchildren have been taught water conservation measures.

=== Sweden ===
The Swedish International Development Agency (SIDA) has participated in the development of feasibility and design studies for the north regional wastewater treatment plant and associated sewerage collection systems in Gaza.

=== United States Agency for International Development (USAID) ===
USAID is a leading development agency within the sector in the Palestinian territories. Their work includes the repair and rehabilitation of small scale water and sanitation facilities, rehabilitation of water and sewage networks as well as replacement of water pumps. In addition, USAID helps communities without access to piped water through water supply via tankers. In rural areas, the agency provides water collection cisterns to poor families. USAID helps to connect households to water and to install rainwater drainage pipes.

On the official web page, USAID announces to provide more than 60 km of water pipes in order to supply ten additional villages in the southern Nablus area with potable water. By 2009, USAID has improved water supply for more than 19,500 households while about 30,000 households gained improved sanitation and connections to sewage networks.

An example of USAID's work in the Palestinian territories is the Emergency Water and Sanitation and Other Infrastructure Program. Between 2008 and 2013 USAID finances the second phase of the program. It is supposed to address the urgent need of adequate water and sanitation systems e.g. by providing emergency relief and rehabilitation of existing systems. Another program funded by USAID from 2008 to 2013 is the Infrastructure Needs Program. It does not only focus on water, but also includes the financing of other infrastructure that is critical for economic growth. With regard to water, several achievements have been accomplished in 2010. For example, a water transmission line, water distribution systems, reservoirs, and steel water pipes have been built.

=== World Bank ===
Under the Second Gaza Water and Sanitation Project which is active from 2005 to 2010, the World Bank provides US$20 million. One objective of the project is to develop a sustainable institutional structure of the water and sanitation sector. This is planned to be achieved through supporting the establishment of a Coastal Water Utility which is owned by the local governments and through increased private sector participation. In addition, the project seeks to strengthen the regulatory and institutional capacity of the PWA. The second objective of the project is the improvement of the water and sanitation services through rehabilitation, upgrade and expansion of the existing facilities.

In January 2008, another US$5 million for the project have been approved by the bank. The additional funding will contribute to finance the institutional strengthening of the Coastal Municipal Water Utility, which has suffered from a very difficult security situation. Moreover, operation and maintenance costs of the water and sanitation facilities in the Gaza Strip for one additional year are covered. One aim is to reduce non-revenue water from 45% to 35%, accompanied by an increase of revenues and customer satisfaction. The funding also provides for water meters, chemicals for water treatment and disinfection and the rehabilitation of water production wells.

In addition, the bank provides US$12 million for the North Gaza Emergency Sewage Treatment (NGEST) Project, which seeks to mitigate the health and environmental risks which arise from the Beit Lahia Waterwater Treatment Plant. Effluents of the treatment plant are discharged into a lake, putting the surrounding communities at risk. The objective of the project is to provide a long-term solution to wastewater treatment in the Gaza northern governorate. In order to achieve this, the lake is drained. New infiltration basins are built in another location, where the effluent of the lake will be transferred. A new wastewater treatment plant with improved quality standards will be built, covering the whole northern governorate.

In 2011, the World Bank approved three water and sanitation projects in the West Bank and Gaza. The Water Sector Capacity Building Project is supposed to support the Palestinian Water Authority by providing e.g. advisory support, technical assistance and staff training. The objective is to strengthen the PWA's capacity of monitoring, planning and regulating water sector development in the Palestinian territories. Furthermore, the Water Supply and Sanitation Improvements for West Bethlehem Villages Project aims at the preparation of a feasibility study and a project concept for wastewater management and reuse in selected rural communities. Other components shall strengthen the capacity of the Water and Wastewater Department and increase the reliability of an existing water supply system. Finally, the bank approved the third additional financing of the Second Gaza Emergency Water Project. Besides the capacity improvement of both the PWA and the coastal municipalities' water utility, the project shall ensure the management, operation and delivery of wastewater and water services.

== See also ==
- Israeli expropriation of Palestinian springs in the West Bank
- Israeli–Palestinian Joint Water Committee
- Water politics in the Jordan River basin
- Water politics in the Middle East
- Water Rights in Israel-Palestine
- Water, Sanitation and Hygiene Monitoring Program
- Water supply and sanitation in Israel

== Sources ==
- Abdhen, Ziad (2010). "Water Culture in Palestine". In Tal, Alon; Rabbo, Alfred Abed (eds.). Water Wisdom: Preparing the Groundwork for Cooperative and Sustainable Water Management in the Middle East. Rutgers University Press. pp. 67–70. ISBN 978-0-813-54770-1.
- Beckouche, Pierre (2017). "Occupied Palestinian Territory". Europe's Mediterranean Neighbourhood. Edward Elgar Publishing. pp. 146–156. ISBN 978-1-786-43149-3.
- Benvenisti, Eyal (2012). The International Law of Occupation. Oxford University Press. ISBN 978-0-199-58889-3.
- Cooley, John K. (Spring 1984). "The War over Water". Foreign Policy. No. 54. pp. 3–26. JSTOR 1148352.
- de Chatel, Francesca (2011). Water Sheikhs and Dam Builders: Stories of People and Water in the Middle East. Transaction Publishers. ISBN 978-1-412-80988-7.
- Dillman, Jeffrey D. (Autumn 1989). "Water Rights in the Occupied Territories". Journal of Palestine Studies. 19 (1): 46–71. doi:10.1525/jps.1989.19.1.00p0151f. JSTOR 2537245.
- Falah, Ghazi-Walid (2005). "The Geopolitics of 'Enclavisation' and the Demise of a Two-State Solution to the Israeli-Palestinian Conflict". Third World Quarterly. 26 (8): 1341–1372. doi:10.1080/01436590500255007. JSTOR 4017718. S2CID 154697979.
- Feldinger, Lauren Gelfond (13 April 2013). "The politics of water: Palestinians bracing for another dry summer". Haaretz.
- Finkelstein, Norman (2003). Image and Reality of the Israel-Palestine Conflict. Verso Books. ISBN 978-1-85984-442-7.
- Hareuveni, Eyal (May 2011). Dispossession and Exploitation: Israel's Policy in the Jordan Valley and Northern Dead Sea (PDF). B'Tselem.
- "Occupation, Inc.How Settlement Businesses Contribute to Israel's Violations of Palestinian Rights". Human Rights Watch. 19 January 2016.
- Joyce, Tom, ed. (12 April 2016). "The Palestinian farmers battling border restrictions and lack of water". The Guardian.
- Lonergan, Stephen C.; Brooks, David B. (1994). Watershed: The Role of Fresh Water in the Israeli-Palestinian Conflict. International Development Research Centre. ISBN 978-1-552-50097-2.
- Niksic, Orhan; Eddin, Nur Nasser; Cali, Massimiliano (2014). Area C and the Future of the Palestinian Economy. World Bank Publications. ISBN 978-1-464-80196-9.

=== Sources ===
- Troubled Waters–Palestinians denied fair access to water. Amnesty International, October 2009. On Israel rations Palestinians to trickle of water
- Dispossession and Exploitation: Israel's Policy in the Jordan Valley and Northern Dead Sea. B'Tselem, May 2011. On
- (West Bank and Gaza): Assessment of Restrictions on Palestinian Water Sector Development (PDF) (Sector Note). Middle East and North Africa Region Sustainable Development, the International Bank for Reconstruction and Development / The World Bank. April 2009. Report No. 47657-GZ. Archived from the original (PDF) on 2013-06-05.
  - Linked from: "Responses to the Water Restrictions Report". Countries : Middle East and North Africa : West Bank & Gaza. The World Bank Group. 11 May 2009. Archived from the original on 2011-06-12.
- Water for Life. Water, Sanitation and Hygiene Monitoring Program (WaSH MP) 2007/2008. Palestinian Hydrology Group (PHG) (7,3 MB)
- The Truth Behind the Palestinian Water Libels by Prof. Haim Gvirtzman, Begin–Sadat Center for Strategic Studies, 24 February 2014
