= The Environmental Provisions of Oslo II Accords =

The Oslo II Accord, also known as the Interim Agreement on the West Bank and Gaza Strip or more simply Oslo II, established provisions and policies on the environment in six distinct articles within the first appendix of Annex III, "Protocol Concerning Civil Affairs." The key areas addressed are agriculture, environmental protection, forests, nature reserves, parks, and water and sewage.

== Context within Agreement ==
The accords contain seven Annexes which specify the agreements on a certain topic. Annex III lays out the arrangements for the management of various spheres of civil affairs. Under this Annex, the powers and responsibilities for management of these areas are transferred from the Israeli military government and the Civil Administration to the Palestinian side. Part of the civil affairs are the provisions on the environment.

== Contents ==
=== Article 1: Agriculture ===
Article 1 first names all the aspects of agriculture, including but not limited to veterinary services and livestock management, water for irrigation, grazing and farming, and policies relating to raising and marketing crops. Irrigation water is mentioned and linked to Article 40 on water and sewage, and forestry is dealt with in greater detail in Article 14 on forests. Both sides should cooperate to conduct studies and research collecting scientific data for the development of the agriculture sector. Agriculture Relations such as trade between both sides are mentioned under Annex V (Economic Relations).

=== Article 12: Environmental Protection ===
Article 12 is divided into Section A on the “Transfer of Authority” and Section B on “Cooperation and Understandings”.

Section A expresses mutual Israeli and Palestinian recognition of the importance of environmental protection and the need for a sustainable approach to using natural resources, and determines the transfer of power to the Palestinian side.

Section B reviews various joint measures in protecting the environment relating to policy on natural resources, industrial development, avoiding damages to the environment, addressing pollution, waste and discharge regulations and biodiversity. In particular, mentioned measures are promoting public awareness on environmental issues, adopting international standards on global (ozone layer) and regional concerns (protection of endangered species, restriction of trade, preservation of forests and nature reserves) and implement Environmental Impact Assessments (EIA). Schedule 2 lists 12 areas for which Environmental Impact Assessments should be prepared (e.g. power plants, quarries, treatment plants, disposal sides, air- and seaports and major roads). Additionally Israel recognizes the unsatisfactory situation of the environment in the West Bank and obligates itself to assist in improving it. Both parties agree on improving scientific, technical and political cooperation concerning the environment. An Environmental Experts Committee for environmental cooperation and understandings shall be established on both sides.

=== Article 13: Fishery ===
This article identifies the licensing and permits for all aspects of the fishing industry along the Gaza Strip, and refers to security restrictions in a separate article (Article XIV).

=== Article 14, 25, 26: Forests; Nature Reserves; Parks ===
Management of forests, parks, and nature reserves will be transferred to the Council whose responsibilities will include preservation, administration, prevention of damage, and establishment of new resources (i.e. parks, reserves, and forests). Article 14 specifically affirms the Palestinian administration's right to plant new forests, whether in the interest of environmental protection or for landscaping purposes. Article 25 (Nature Reserves) addresses the enforcement and regulation of hunting and ban on hunting species that are protected and/or endangered. All three articles identify areas for cooperation between both sides. Areas for cooperation include protection, data gathering and scientific research, and ecological services such as managing fires and pest control. The management of forests, parks, and nature reserves is linked to concerns, such as desertification and erosion, which are addressed in Article 12 (Environmental Protection).

With respect to Area C, each article affirms the eventual transfer of responsibility for the application of the many provisions to Palestinian administration, except in the case of certain issues which are to be deferred until the permanent status negotiations. Israeli and Palestinian actors are to coordinate all activities with the potential to alter the condition of each sphere and which will occur within Area C, excluding settlements and military zones.

=== Article 40: Water and Sewage ===
The agreement rests on good-will and at its core is the principle of Israeli recognition of Palestinians’ rights to water in the West Bank. The main principles address developing additional water, coordinating management of water resources and wastewater systems, treating influent for eventual reuse, and ensuring water quality and the prevention of harm. Powers and responsibilities in the domain of water and sewage in the West Bank and the Gaza Strip will be transferred to the Palestinian Council, while the question of infrastructure ownership is deferred until the permanent status negotiations. The final principle (paragraph 25) relates to the Gaza Strip and maintains the status quo on already existing provisions and agreements relating to the water resources and sewage systems in the area; schedule 11 reviews these arrangements.

==== Water Supply ====
The section includes an estimation of future water needs for Palestinians (70-80 mcm/yr). Israel is committed to providing a total of 9.5 mcm of water per year to major Palestinian cities including Hebron, Bethlehem, Ramallah, Salfit, Nablus, Jenin, and the Gaza Strip. The Palestinians are to be responsible for providing these areas with the additional supply of 19.2 mcm per year, which may be drawn from the Eastern Aquifer. Schedule 10 enumerates precise allowances for extractions and use of water from the Eastern, North-Eastern, and Western Aquifers.

==== Management and Cooperation (Joint Water Committee) ====
Israel and Palestinian administration are to cooperate in the exchange of data and in identification of sites for construction of new wells. The Joint Water Committee is formed to handle all water and sewage issues in the West Bank, including the following responsibilities: the joint management and protection of water resources and sewage systems; handling information exchange, regulation and monitoring, and the resolution of water and sewage conflict. The JWC will act to review all development projects in all their stages and determine whether to issue approval for their implementation. The role and obligations of the Joint Water Committee (Article 40, paragraph 15) are further expanded in Schedule 8. Schedule 9 expands on supervision and enforcement mechanisms (Article 40, Paragraph 17), and addresses water purchases and cost. Paragraph 20 sets forth additional areas for cooperation between various committees with respect to economics and regional development.

==== Protection and Prevention of Harm and Contamination ====
Paragraphs 21 through 23 dictate that both sides should endeavor to prevent any harm, pollution, or contamination of the quality of water resources within their respective areas as well as within that of the other's. Paragraph 24 also mandates that both sides will be responsible for compensating the other for “any unauthorized use of or sabotage to water and sewage systems situated in the areas under its responsibility which serve the other side (Article 40, paragraph 24).”

== Current situation ==
The Oslo II accords is the latest agreement between Israel and Palestine concerning the environment. In negotiations and discussions between Israel and Palestine, the parties mainly refer to this judicial framework. However its actual relevance remains unclear. Some provisions like the Environmental Impact Assessments have never been implemented. As one example of temporary cooperation the bilateral environmental committee can be mentioned. It worked until 2000 and managed in this time several trans boundary problems concerning hazardous waste. Although the environmental negotiations that took place within the framework of the Oslo Accords can be seen as a significant milestone for environmental cooperation, many objectives were never achieved. This outcome can be attributed to four main factors: Israeli security concerns, territorial disputes, logistical ambiguities and Palestinian institutional constraints. The Israeli-Palestinian Joint Water Committee is an example of still working cooperation. But it is not fulfilling its original purpose of a joint water governance institution. The Committee is now said to be an Israel dominated body that mainly rejects Palestinian requests. Current disputes between Israel and Palestine are often addressing untreated waste water flow into opponent streams.

== Reception ==
Since the Oslo II accords have been declared to be an interim agreement many aspects remain vague. A following agreement is needed which settles important details. In particular the unsolved dispute about water supply needs to be addressed. Both sides accuse each other for agreement violations. From the Palestinian side Israel does not keep their promise to recognize Palestinian water rights. Israel on the other hand sees Palestinian well drilling without permission as a violation of Oslo II.

== See also ==
- Palestinian law
