= Israeli–Palestinian Joint Water Committee =

The Israeli–Palestinian Joint Water Committee (JWC) is a joint Israeli–Palestinian authority, created in 1995 by the Oslo II Accord. Its purpose is to manage water and sewage related infrastructure in the West Bank, particularly to take decisions on maintenance of existing infrastructure and approval of new projects. Although it was originally intended to be a temporary organ for a five years interim period, it still exists as of 2015.

== Establishment ==
The Israeli–Palestinian "Joint Water Committee" (JWC) was established in September 1995 as part of the Oslo II Accord. Originally, it was intended to be a temporary organ for a five years interim period. Its role is overseeing the water resources in the West Bank, excluding water from the Jordan River. As of 2014, the JWC is still in effect.

A similar Israeli–Jordanian Joint Water Committee also exists since 1994.

== Functioning of the Committee ==
The JWC has an equal number of representatives from both sides. Pursuant to the Oslo II Accord, all decisions of the JWC have to be reached by consensus, which means that each side has a veto. Anders Jägerskog concluded that the power asymmetry between the parties effectively gives Israel the upper hand in the decisions with regard to the implementation of the agreements. While the Committee reviews the technical aspects of new projects, the political dimensions are subject to decisions of the Israeli and Palestinian Governments.

In 2009, Amnesty International criticized the establishment of the JWC for having ″merely institutionalized the intrinsically discriminatory system of Israeli control over Palestinian resources that had already been in existence since Israel’s occupation of the OPT three decades earlier.″ Palestinians must obtain JWC approval for any project involving water extraction from the Mountain Aquifer and for all other water-related projects in Area C (60% of the West Bank). This also affects the Areas A and B, which exist as enclaves within Area C. The Israeli authorities, not only determine the quantity of water that the Palestinians are allowed to extract from the Mountain Aquifer but also control even the small quantities of rainwater that Palestinian villagers collect. By contrast, the PA has no power or means to monitor, still less to limit, the quantity of water that Israel extracts from the Mountain Aquifer in the West Bank or inside Israel.

The World Bank noted: ″The JWC has not fulfilled its role of providing an effective collaborative governance framework for joint resource management and investment... The JWC does not function as a “joint” water resource governance institution because of fundamental asymmetries - of power, of capacity, of information, of interests – that prevent the development of a consensual approach to resolving water management conflicts.″ An observer of a major international donor, who attended JWC meetings, told that the Committee, in practice, was almost entirely in the hands of the Israeli representatives. He called ″the interaction between the two sides during the meetings ... an exercise in subjugation and humiliation.″

According to the Palestinian Water Authority, Israel has rejected or obstructed scores of Palestinian requests for implementing water projects, or only agreed after long delays. Many proposed projects are not even submitted to the Committee by the PWA, because they were certain that the Israeli side in no way would agree to it as to previous unsuccessful attempts. While the Israeli Authorities control the Palestinian activities and force them to oblige to their orders, the Palestinian Authority has no power or means of monitoring the quantity of water that the Israelis extract, including the Israeli settlements in the West Bank. The Israelis also control the quantities of rain water collected by the Palestinian Villagers. According to the PWA, the Israeli Army more often destroys the small Palestinian water tankers and the surface rainwater collection wells.

The NGO Palestinian Hydrology Group (PHG) has criticized Israel for practically veto any Palestinian project, while implementing by military force all Israeli projects, without the approval of the JWC. According to the PHG, the JWC was able to function properly in the early years of the Interim Agreement, but became extremely dysfunctional soon after the five year interim period and with the start of the Second Intifada.

=== 2013 study ===
In a comprehensive 2013 study by the British researcher Jan Selby, the functioning of the Joint Water Committee during the period 1995-2008 was analysed. Selby that in the years studied, the Palestinian Water Authority had approved all Israeli applications for new water supply facilities for West Bank settlements, while Israel had vetoed every application from Palestine for new wells using the Western Basin of the Mountain Aquifer and had delayed approval of other applications for as many as eight years, concluding that the "Israeli-Palestinian water ‘cooperation’ – in the form of a Joint Water Committee (JWC) – has been associated with a significant worsening of the Palestinian water supply crisis," concluding that it was being used by Israel as an instrument of control and represented the first evidence "of the PA lending its official consent to parts of Israel’s settlement expansion programme."

== Examples of Israeli obstruction ==
Approval of projects by the Joint Water Committee does not guarantee its execution. Once an approval is granted, additional permits must then be obtained from the Israeli army before any work can be commenced in Area C of the West Bank. Obtaining such permits entails a lengthy and protracted bureaucratic process. Many applications are rejected, others are subject to long delays. Works, including installing or repairing water mains and supply pipes, can be blocked or interrupted for long periods for the stated reason of "security considerations".

Amnesty International investigated the execution of a project for drilling wells in the Hizmah area (north-east of Jerusalem). With the appropriation of much of the land of Hizmah in favour of Israeli settlements, the village lost access to its springs and other water resources. An approval for two wells was requested in 2000 and approved by the JWC in April 2001. After further approval by the Joint Technical Committee, it was sent to the Israeli Ministry of Defense for its approval. The IDF did not approve the drilling at the allotted locations. In December 2004, the Israeli authorities asked for new locations. Then, the IDF started planning the route of the Separation Wall around Jerusalem. In 2008, the Civil Administration asked for new locations; the wells were rejected because they would lie inside the planned wall. The residents fully depend on water sold by the Israeli national water company Mekorot.

A new well in Rujeib was approved by JWC as well as IDF and under construction since 2003. After Hamas won the municipal elections, the funding was temporarily stopped. When eventually the well was near completion in 2008, the IDF ordered the work to stop and move it 25 metres to an impossible site.

Construction of a Salfit sewage treatment plant was initially approved in early 1997 by JWC and IDF, but the construction was ordered to stop in 1998, because on that location it would hinder the intended expansion of the nearby settlement Ariel. In 2001, Israel paid the German donors a fraction of the financial damage as compensation. In 2007, the IDF proposed to convey the waste from the settlements to Israel. A Palestinian treatment plant would “create additional environmental hazards and damage the landscape”, thus the army proposed to treat the Palestinian sewage also in Israel. The Palestinian Water Authority rejected this, as it would have to pay for the treatment and loose the recycled water. Ariel, however, continued to discharge its untreated wastewater in the vicinity.

== Statements ==
Nancy Murray, the former Director of Education at the ACLU of Massachusetts, the co-founder of the Gaza Mental Health Foundation and a member of the Alliance for Water Justice in Palestine, has criticized Israel for practically veto any Palestinian project in this committee.

== See also ==
- Water supply and sanitation in the Palestinian territories
- The Environmental Provisions of Oslo II Accords
- Israel-Palestine relations
