= Water, Sanitation and Hygiene Monitoring Program =

The Water, Sanitation and Hygiene Monitoring Program or WaSH MP is a local initiative that is responsible for monitoring the enduring crisis in the water sector in the Palestinian territories (oPt).

== Overview ==
In a region already suffering severe water stress, the ongoing political, economic and social crisis in the oPt has resulted in near catastrophic consequences for the water, sanitation and hygiene (WaSH) situation. Local and international non-governmental organizations (NGOs) working in the water sector, in tandem with the Palestinian Water Authority (PWA), are trying, under restrictive political conditions and within limited budgets, to ensure that all Palestinians are able to access sufficient water supplies and sanitation services.

== History ==
The Palestinian Hydrology Group (PHG), as the leading Palestinian NGO working in the water sector, has undertaken the responsibility for initiating the program. In June 2002 the WaSH MP was launched in response to the urgent need for increased information, resources and action related to the deteriorating WaSH situation in the West Bank and Gaza Strip. The need for quantitative data to support ongoing advocacy and humanitarian initiatives by donors, international NGOs, and local NGOs working in the water sector in the oPt has been the main driving force behind the initiation and further development of the WaSH MP.

== Objective ==
The main objective of the WaSH MP is to respond to the water crisis in the oPt by increasing local and international awareness of the WaSH situation while further encouraging mobilization around the emergency needs of the most vulnerable communities. Additionally, the hope is that this will help to stimulate political and environmental change through the use of timely and pertinent information (data) in order to help remedy the dire WaSH situation. These efforts are inline with achieving the UN Millennium Development Goals (MDG’s) in relation to water and sanitation (UN MDG 7 – Target 10). As part of the WaSH MP, PHG has taken the responsibility for monitoring the extent to which Target 10 can be realized under these deteriorating conditions in the oPt, and for identifying the limitations in its achievement. In the process of identifying the main constraints facing the realization of this goal, and in addressing water issues and crises afflicted on Palestinian communities in the West Bank and Gaza Strip, reliable water related data collection has become of paramount importance.

== Program Scope ==
In the current phase of the program, the WaSH MP managed to collect data from 660 of the 708 Palestinian communities and had disseminated the information through annual, monthly and weekly reports. This program covers the overwhelming majority of communities in the oPt and spans across all governorates throughout the West Bank and Gaza Strip. A total of 660 communities are now surveyed during each annual monitoring period. The remaining 48 communities which are not surveyed as part of the ongoing monitoring process are left out due to various reasons including: religious locality with limited access, East Jerusalem communities (limited access to municipal information), no people due to Israeli planned transfer, seasonal community, and or a community with services that are an integral part of another locality.

== Program Indicators ==
Information quality of WaSH MP data outputs is defined in terms of its "fitness for use" by the end user. The six dimensions of data quality are relevance, accuracy, timeliness, accessibility, interpretability, and coherence. The information is collected from the field, by means of a standardized questionnaire, and is checked as part of a quality assurance process by Technical Field Monitors (TFMs) who are located in the West Bank and Gaza Strip. In order to provide this service the WaSH MP has further refined its data criteria by creating twelve indicators. The twelve indicators currently used are as follows: status of households with year-round access to a water source, per capita water supply, wastewater network coverage, cesspit and septic tank coverage, availability of solid waste collection system, prevalence of water-borne diseases, status of operation and maintenance of water supply facilities, cost recovery for water supply services, unaccounted-for water within the water supply system, monthly household income spent on water supply, monthly household income spent on sanitation, as well as a compilation of major community problems and needs. The commitment on behalf of the WaSH MP to the continuous improvement of data will ensure that international organizations, donors, INGO’s, NGO’s, academics and all interested persons receive WaSH-related data that meets the growing needs of the Palestinian people, as well as the development and humanitarian sectors.

== Program Deliverables ==
The WaSH MP has been alerting organizations working in the water sector in the oPt to problems that require urgent and longer-term attention. Furthermore, the WaSH MP has striven in educating those outside the Palestinian water sector nationally and internationally on the WaSH crisis in the oPt. The program also provides a direct channel for WaSH related information regarding the most vulnerable areas to be disseminated to the humanitarian sector and the international community in order for them to stay abreast of emergency needs. As part of the program deliverables an annual report is published along with quarterly based need assessment reports, monthly data sets, and pilot monitoring of selected Palestinian communities. Additionally emergency alerts are posted on a need be basis and are identified as part of the continuous monitoring process. The WaSH MP website comprises an archive of all published material, including reports, alerts and photographs to serve as a reference source.

== Obstacles ==
In the past, WaSH related data collection in the oPt has been difficult to source, disparate in nature, and generally incomplete. The data available failed to describe, accurately, the reality on the ground for many communities — much less has it served as a tool for improving the dissemination of critical information. It also failed to provide a comprehensive indication of the vulnerability of numerous communities, and could not be relied upon to assess whether these communities had the capacity and coping mechanisms to solve WaSH related problems. This can be attributed to the difficulties in acquiring a consistent source of data while under occupation. The unpredictable nature of life in the oPt is primarily due to the lack of control Palestinians have over their own affairs. This creates numerous obstacles to planning and implementing a monitoring program.

== Support ==
In the past financial support has been awarded by Oxfam-GB and UNICEF.
