= Palestinian law =

Palestinian law is the law administered by the Palestinian National Authority (PNA or PA) within the territory pursuant to the Oslo Accords. It has an unusually unsettled status, as of 2025, due to the complex legal history of the area. Palestinian law includes many of the legal regimes and precepts used in Palestinian ruled territory and administered by the Palestinian Authority (West Bank areas A and B) and Hamas (Gaza Strip), which is not an independent nation-state.

The scope of this article is to explain the legal history, context and development of law, the current fields of study of law in Palestinian ruled territory, as well as the state of lawlessness in those territories. It is also to discuss the domestic and international positions on which set of laws are controlling in Palestinian ruled territory today. The scope of this article does not include the legal status or framework of the Gaza Strip, nor individual legal cases and crimes.

== Terminology ==
Due to the changing usages of the terms "Palestine" and "Palestinian" throughout history, the term may also be associated with regimes that are not associated with the Palestinian law of today. Examples include the discussion (in a reference work dating from 1906) of the Talmudic interpretation of laws from Palestine before 70 AD, also known as Halakha: "Those of the laws of Palestine that were extended after the Exile were originally enacted for the purpose of protecting the judicial administration and economic interests of Palestine, and with a view to encourage settlement there." Such references to ancient Palestinian law do not apply to the Palestinian legal situation since at least 1948.

== Jurisdictional background ==
Essentially, says one legal scholar, "the legal system in 'Palestine' consists of layer upon layer of law that almost all remain in effect." The major issue is the:

question of whether the emerging state of Palestine will be capable of overseeing a system of rule of law. This debate is important not only in the political arena but in the legal arena as well, since a viable state must have a legal system that is functional and reliable. Despite the historically deteriorated condition of the Gazan and West Bank legal systems under occupation, the Palestinians recently have sought to seize the opportunity to determine the fate of their own legal heritage. To determine how this may be possible, we must look at what laws currently exist in the Palestinian territories. The law applied in different parts of the West Bank and Gaza strip is a combination of the various laws imposed on said areas throughout this century. Instead of each new law superseding the previous law, almost all of these laws remain in effect in the territories. Therefore, one would have to research multiple legal systems and codes to determine the law in one area. This is quite a confusing situation. The Palestinian legal system can be compared to a tossed salad, with layers of different laws and systems all mixed up into a confused mess. This situation in the Palestinian Territories is perhaps unprecedented in modern history.

—

The laws that applied come from many jurisdictions through history: "Customary Law ... Ottoman Law ... British Law ... Jordanian Law ... Egyptian Law ... Israeli" law and even the informal strictures of the intifada, and finally, the Palestinian National Authority's Basic Law.

The subject of sovereignty is both controversial and unsettled; "neither the PLO nor the PA is recognized as a sovereign state by the United States.”

== Basic Law ==
The Basic Law, established in 2002, is the proposed constitution of a future Palestinian state. According to one report, "Palestinians had been requesting that the law be signed into effect since 1997, in order to formally guarantee a modicum of basic rights." It was enacted by the PLC (the Legislature of PNA) and signed by Yasser Arafat. It was amended on March 19, 2003 "to allow the creation of the Prime Minister Position in the Palestinian National Authority...."

=== Articles of the Basic Law ===
The Basic Law has 121 articles.

The "bill of rights" Articles of the Basic Law, as amended March 19, 2003, cover the following topics:

1. "Palestine is part of the large[r] Arab World ... ."
2. "The People is the source of power" and the three branches of government enshrines "the principle of separation of powers".
3. States that "Jerusalem is the Capital of Palestine."
4. Islamic law is the basis, and Arabic is the official language, of Palestine
5. Creates "a democratic parliamentary system based on political and party pluralism" and a popularly elected President
6. Recognizes the "principle of the rule of law".
7. Regulates citizenship
8. Defines the official flag
9. Protects against "discrimination because of race, sex, color, religion, political views, or disability".
10. Protection of human rights
11. Protection of freedom and procedural due process
12. Rights to "be informed of the reasons for his arrest or detention", to contact an attorney, and a speedy trial (Miranda rights)
13. No duress, torture or forced confessions
14. Rights to be "innocent until proven guilty", to a defense, and to a lawyer for defense
15. Crime and punishment defined by law
16. Right to bodily integrity
17. Prohibition of searches except by lawful order
18. Freedom of private religious practice. "Freedom of belief, worship, and performance of religious rituals are guaranteed, provided that they do not violate public order or public morals."
19. Freedom of expression
20. Freedom of movement
21. Creation of a free market economy and prohibition against taking without fair compensation
22. Insurance for health, disability, retirement, "welfare of families of martyrs’", and prisoners of war
23. Right to housing
24. Right to an education

== Constitution ==
In February 2026, Palestinian Authority President Mahmoud Abbas published a draft constitution for a proposed Palestinian state, and invited Palestinian citizens, civil society institutions, political forces, experts and academics to comment on the draft. The draft includes 162 articles and, according to Anadolu Agency, is "based on the philosophy and spirit of the Declaration of Independence adopted by the Palestine Liberation Organization in 1988". It stipulates mandatory adherence to United Nations resolutions, international law, and universal human rights standards. The draft expresses pride in Palestinian identity, identifies the Palestinian people as the source of authority and legitimacy, and upholds the rule of law as the chief protector of freedom. The interim constitution is also intended to mark the start of the journey toward Palestinian independence and sovereignty.

The draft constitution also affirms Palestinian sovereignty over Jerusalem, designating it as the state's capital and central political, spiritual, and cultural hub. However, while it pledges protection for Islamic and Christian holy sites, it also omitted references to Jewish historical or religious ties to the city. The draft also designated Islam as Palestine's official religion and also calls for the establishment of Sharia principles to be the "primary source for legislation". While Christianity would be given special status, Judaism has been omitted. A welfare framework would also be established through the proposed draft, supporting families of "martyrs, wounded, and prisoners" through the Palestinian Authority's stipend policy.

Palestinian legal scholar Ahmad al-Ashqar praised the draft constitution as "excellent" and called for prompt public and institutional feedback, followed by a general referendum among Palestinians at home and abroad, as provided in Article 162, noting only minor structural and drafting issues. However, Ghassan Jaber of the Palestinian National Initiative raised concerns about Article 155, warning that it could undermine democracy. He argued that allowing the president or one-third of parliament to initiate amendments gives the executive excessive control over the amendment process. Senior Hamas official Bassem Naim denounced the draft as "an infringement on the fundamental rights of the Palestinian people".

The Times of Israel reported that Israel would likely seek to prevent such a vote due to its opposition of the Palestinian Authority transitioning into statehood. The move would also be widely seen as breaching the Oslo Accords, which stipulate that Palestinian statehood should result from direct bilateral negotiations. Israeli Prime Minister Benjamin Netanyahu has resisted renewed talks, maintaining that the Palestinian Authority has previously rejected statehood proposals.

== Statutes and legislation ==
There is some confusion amongst jurists, scholars and laymen about exactly what legal regime exists, and which laws apply, in Palestinian ruled territory.

Mahdi Abdul Hadi, a legal scholar, believes that all prior and current law continues to apply in the Palestinian territories, including "the British Mandate laws, the Jordanian laws that used to govern the West Bank before 1967 and the Egyptian law that governed Gaza Strip before 1967, in addition to the Israeli military orders." According to Abdul Hadi, the first step was the organization of "Palestinian civil society", that is, a traditional law, "then came the Madrid Conference and the Oslo Accords which drafted laws to govern the Palestinian political life for the interim period." Following that, "the general elections in 1996 ... brought about the Palestinian Legislative Council as the legislative body of the Palestinian people in the Palestinian lands."

Ottoman law has governed Palestine since 1517, and the Ottoman Land Code of 1858 is still in force, one of the causes of international controversy over land seizures. The Ottoman statutory "codification mirrored Islamic law but also incorporated elements of European law, especially the law of France."

== Judicial and customary law ==
Islamic customary law applies in Palestinian ruled territory:

Alongside every formal legal system in Palestinian history, there existed a system of customary law known as "Urf", which means “that which is known” in Arabic. This was a system of rules outside the court system, which handles disputes based on traditional oral customs.

The term urf, meaning "to know", refers to the customs and practices of a given society. Although this was not formally included in Islamic law, the Sharia recognizes customs that prevailed at the time of Muhammad but were not abrogated by the Qur'an or the tradition (this is called "Divine silence"). Practices later innovated are also justified, since Islamic tradition says what the people, in general, consider good is also considered as such by God. Urf is the Islamic equivalent of "common law".

In the application of urf, custom that is accepted into law should be commonly prevalent in the region, not merely in an isolated locality; jurists also tend, with caution, to give precedence to custom over doctoral opinions of highly esteemed scholars.

== Criminal law ==
For the most part, crimes and violent acts are considered crimes of violence and fall under the purview of the criminal justice system. The Palestinian Authority operates under its own criminal law, such as its Penal Code. In addition, "the Palestinian Authority also imposes the death penalty pursuant to the PLO Revolutionary Penal Code, of 1979." The PNA utilizes both military and special, state security courts for most death penalty cases.

The Age of criminal responsibility in the Palestinian Authority-controlled West Bank is unclear. In Jordan, it was the age of 7 until 2014, when it was raised to 12.

== Civil law ==
Civil law used the customary law in Palestine: "Urf covered disputes such as contracts, family disputes, personal injury, and land matters."

== Participatory justice ==
Through the use of urf, Palestinians use alternative dispute resolution, specifically forms of participatory justice: "This system stressed conciliation, mediation, and family honour."

== Palestinian Land Law ==
The Palestinian Land Law is a law that prohibits Palestinians from selling land to Jewish citizens of Israel. The punishment for violators is the death penalty.

== See also ==
- Conflict of laws
- Israeli law
- Criminal procedure
- The Environmental Provisions of Oslo II Accords
- Golan Heights Law
- Hamas, the de facto government of the Gaza Strip
- International criminal law
- Islamic jurisprudence
- Ma'ruf
- Middle East Peace Facilitation Act of 1993
- Qanun (law)
- Sources of Islamic law
- List of Islamic terms in Arabic
- Ulema
- Urf
