= Palestinian Water Authority =

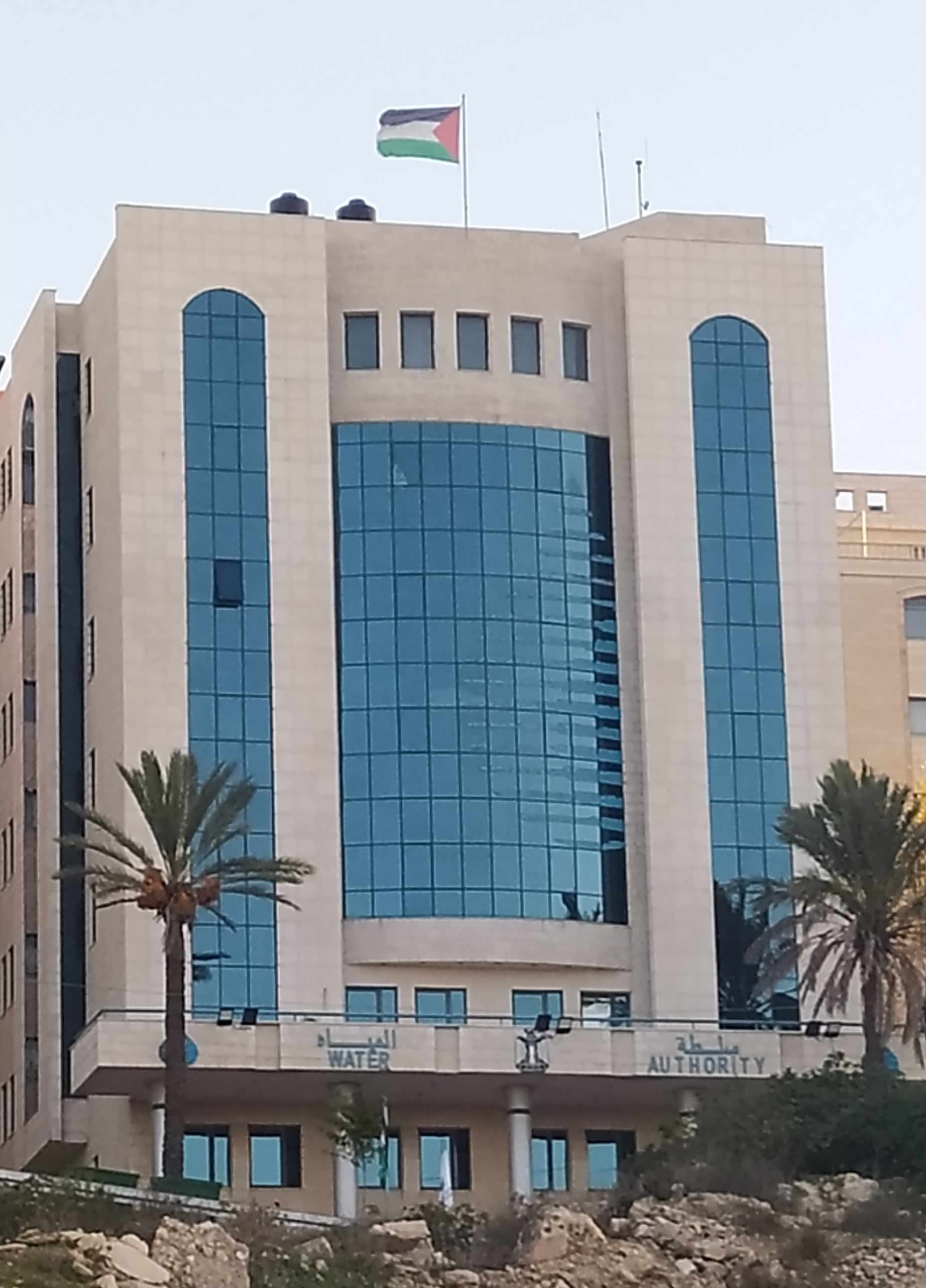
The PWA building in Ramallah

The Palestinian Water Authority (PWA) is a public institution of the State of Palestine, responsible for the management of water resources in Palestine.

== Purpose and tasks ==
The mission of the Palestinian Water Authority is a sustainable development of water resources including the management of surface and groundwater and of wastewater. Its goals include economic growth and water and food security through securing the water rights of the Palestinians.

== See also ==
- Palestinian law
