= Rawabi =

Palestinian town in Ramallah and al-Bireh, West Bank

Rawabi روابي (Arabic)
- City

Arabic transcription(s)
  - Arabic: روابي

Hebrew transcription(s)
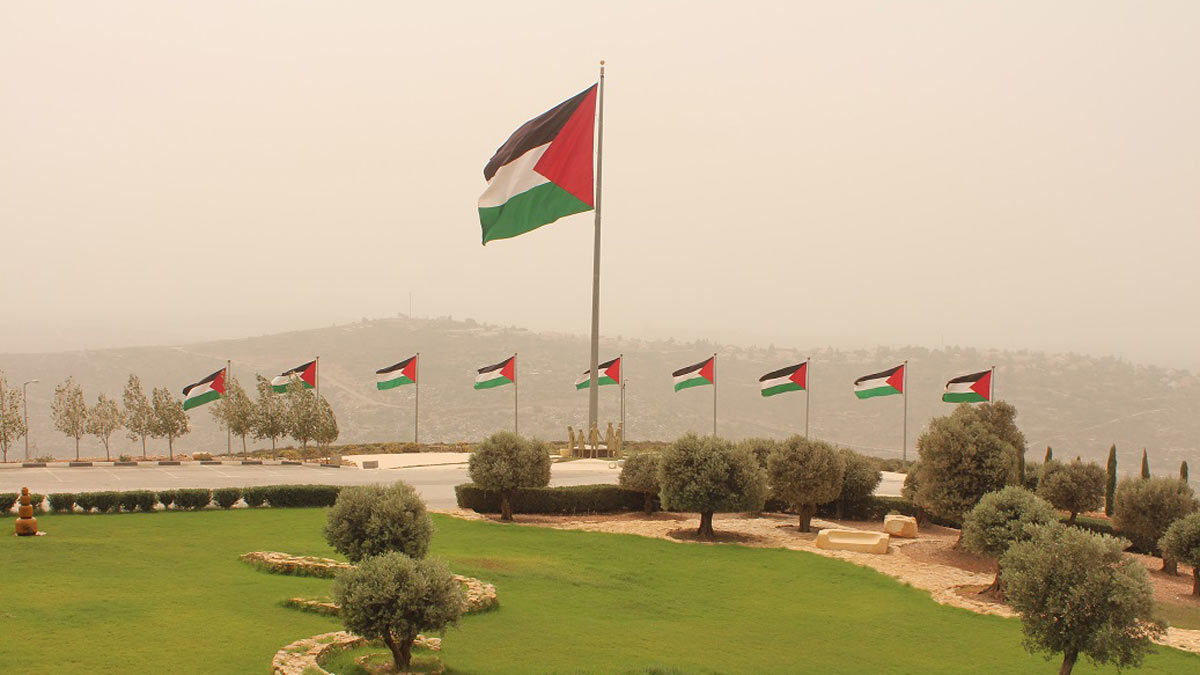
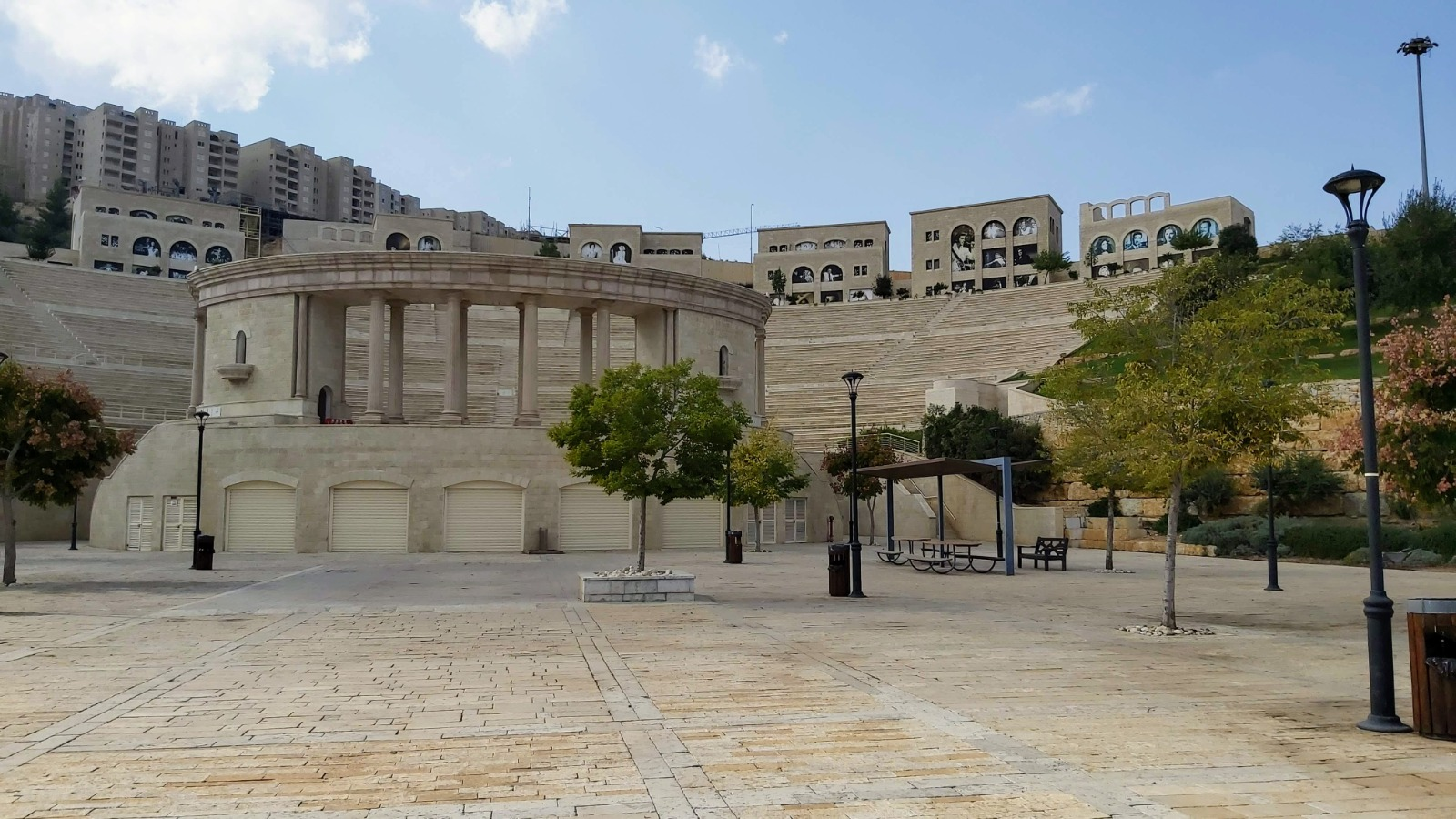
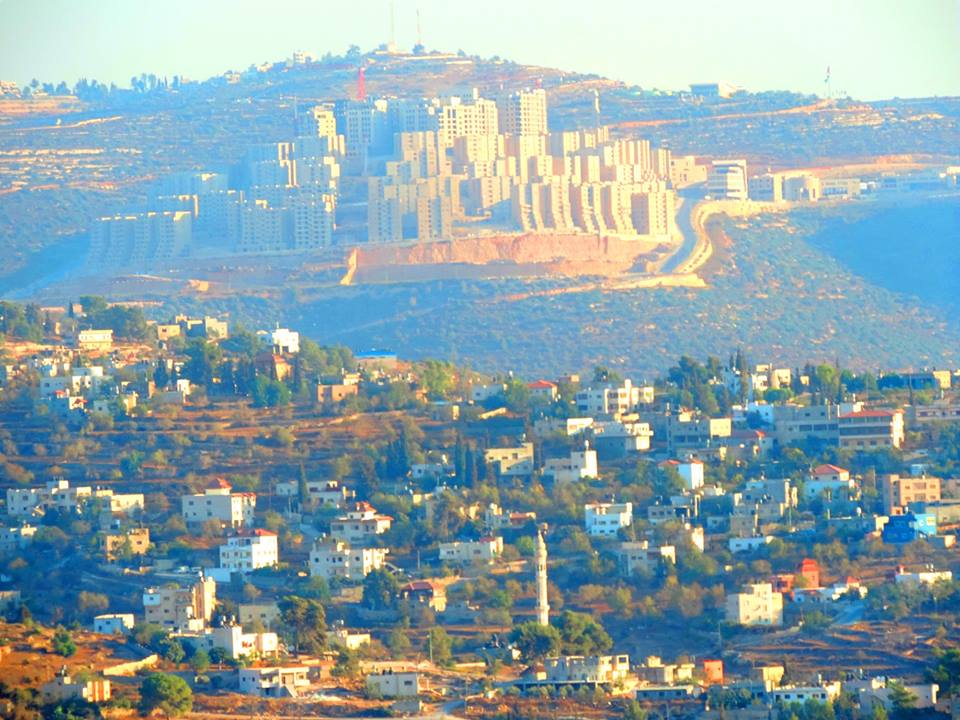
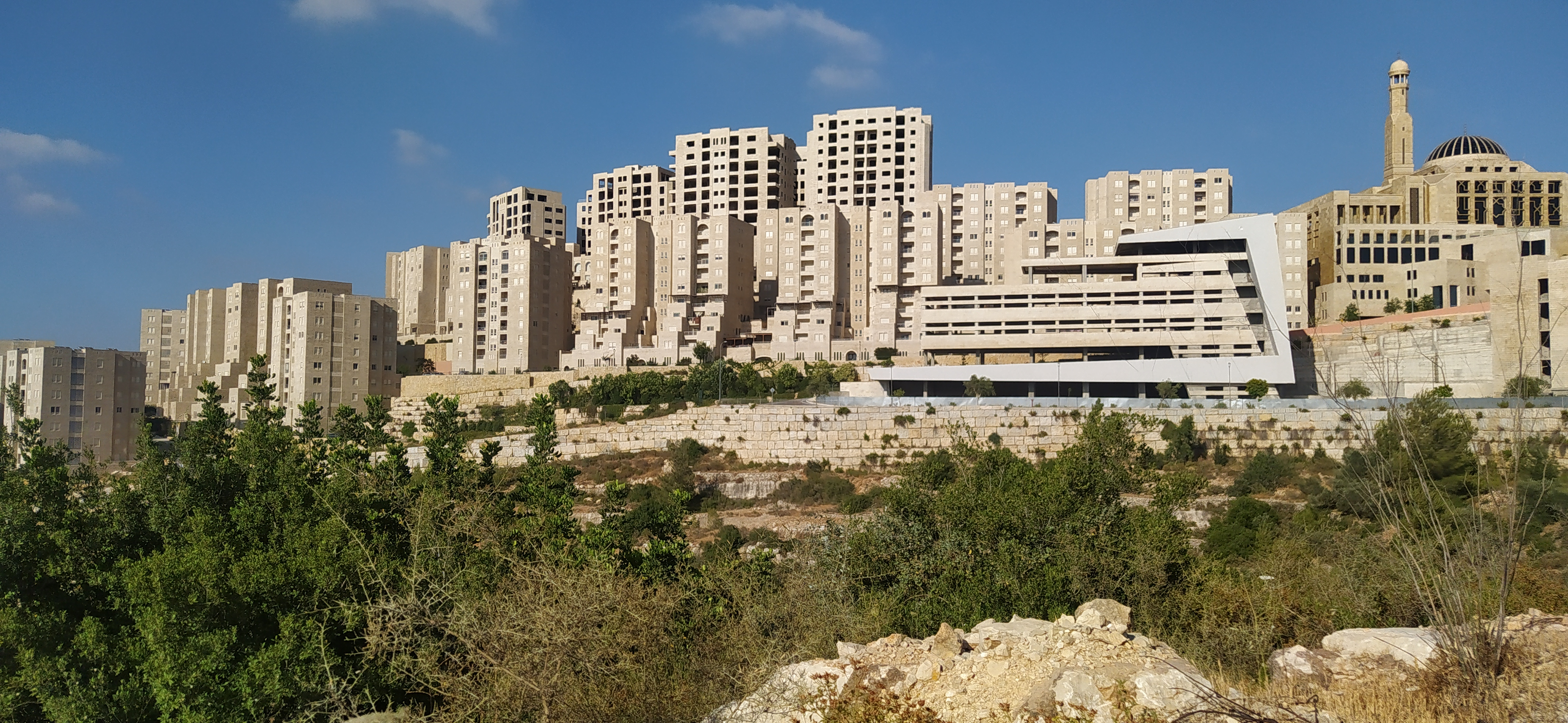
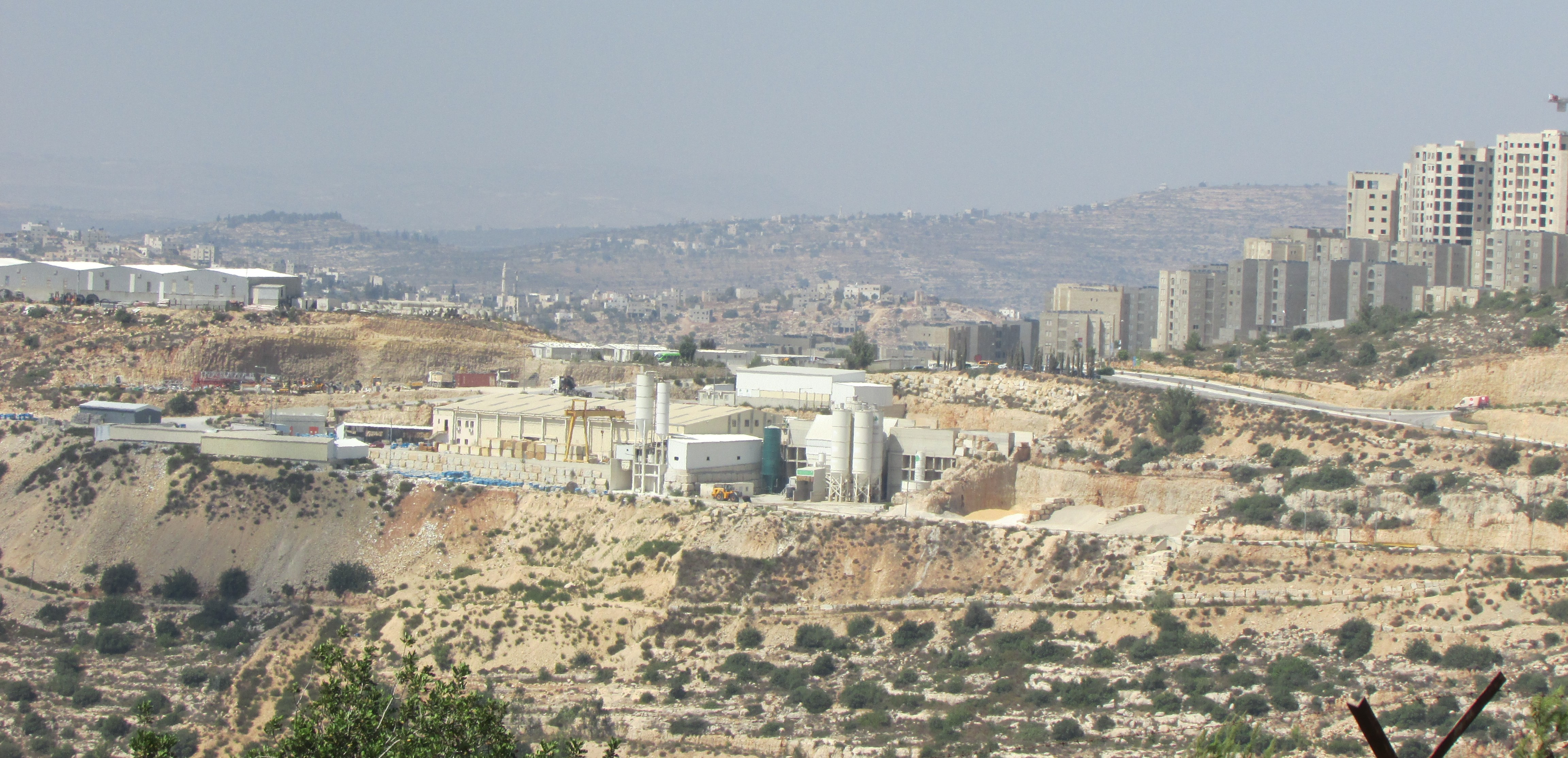
- Clockwise from top: Palestinian flags flying by the Rawabi visitor center, Rawabi in June 2013, Construction view of the industrial area and some Rawabi neighbourhoods from Ateret, Construction site of Rawabi in 2009

- Location of Rawabi within Palestine
- Coordinates: 32°0′36″N 35°11′6″E
- Palestine grid: 173/164
- State: State of Palestine
- Governorate: Ramallah and al-Bireh

Government
  - Type: City (from 2010)
  - Head of Municipality: Ibrahim Natour

Area
  - Total: 6.3 km^{2} (2.4 sq mi)

Population (2017)
  - Total: 710
  - Density: 110/km^{2} (290/sq mi)
- Website: www.rawabi.ps

Rawabi (Arabic: روابي, meaning "The Hills") is the first planned city built for and by Palestinians in the West Bank, and is hailed as a "flagship Palestinian enterprise." Rawabi is located near Birzeit and Ramallah. The master plan envisages a high tech city with 6,000 housing units, housing a population of between 25,000 and 40,000 people, spread across six neighborhoods.

Construction began in January 2010. By 2014, 650 family apartments housing an estimated 3,000 people had been completed and sold, but could not be occupied while negotiations over supplying the city with water stalled. The city remained without water for an extended period due to structural and institutional obstacles. Though Israeli authorities technically approved a water connection, Minister Silvan Shalom withheld implementation, citing the need for the Israeli–Palestinian Joint Water Committee (JWC) to reconvene. The JWC, established under the 1995 Oslo Accords, requires mutual approval for projects, a system that gives Israel de facto veto power over Palestinian water infrastructure. Construction of the pipeline itself was complicated by the fact that parts of its route cross Area C, which is under full Israeli military control. When the hookup was finally approved in early 2015, the initial allocation was limited to 300 cubic meters per day, enough for only a fraction of the city’s anticipated population.

Rawabi covers approximately 6.3 million m² and is being built in phases. The first phase includes around 5,000 housing units. Initially designed to accommodate roughly 25,000 residents, the full plan aims for a population of up to 40,000. As of the most recent report, 250 units have been sold and nearly 1,000 more are under construction.

Occupancy in Rawabi has been limited, with an estimated 2,500–3,000 residents as of 2024, below the projected population for the first phase. Several infrastructure components, including the main access road and parts of the water network, cross Area C of the West Bank, where Israeli control necessitates annual permits and delays full utility service to the city. Construction and infrastructure development have continued, but full occupancy has been constrained by limited water supply, road access, and overall permitting requirements.

The project has seen approximately $1.2 billion in investment. Infrastructure plans include 25 km of roads, water systems, sewage treatment, and green space irrigation.

== Location ==
Rawabi is 9 kilometres (5.6 mi) northwest of Ramallah, 3.5 kilometres (2.2 mi) north of Birzeit, 20 kilometres (12 mi) to the north of Jerusalem, 40 km to the east of Tel Aviv, and 25 kilometres (16 mi) south of Nablus. Amman, the capital of Jordan, is 70 kilometres (43 mi) to the east. In addition, the Israeli settlement of Ateret is nearby. Masri envisages the latter as becoming a suburb of Rawabi in the future. The construction site stretches over two ridges, 700 meters (2,300 ft) above sea level. On a clear day, it is possible to see the Mediterranean Sea, 40 kilometres (25 mi) to the west, and the Israeli coastal city of Tel Aviv from the site. Rawabi's municipal boundaries will encompass 6,300,000 square meters of land. Residential and commercial development is based on a population estimate of 40,000.

== Financing ==
One problem was that the West Bank lacked a traditional mortgage system. To that end, the development was linked to a $500m affordable mortgage scheme. The Washington Post reports that Rawabi "is specifically designed for upwardly mobile families of a sort that in the United States might gravitate to places such as Reston, VA. The developments are also relying on another American import, the home mortgage, including creation of a Fannie Mae-style institution for the West Bank".

Rawabi is the largest private sector project in Palestinian history. It was initiated at the Palestine Investment Conference, which took place in Bethlehem in 2008. The project involves a public-private partnership between Masri's property investment firm, Bayti (My home) Real Estate Investment Company, and his primary corporation, Masser International, which provided a third of the billion dollar investment, together with financial backing from Qatari Diar Real Estate Investment Company (the Qatar Investment Authority's property investment fund), Massar International, and the Palestinian National Authority.

The total cost of the development, mostly funded by the Qatari company LDR and Masri, a native of Nablus and Palestinian multimillionaire, is estimated at US$850 million. As of June 2015, the total investment in Rawabi is US$1.2 billion. Masri sees the development as an integral part of a nation-building project, the construction of a future Palestinian state. He makes the claim that when he was a boy in Nablus, merely carrying a Palestinian flag on the streets was sufficient to get one shot by Israeli soldiers. To complete the project, it was calculated that 8,000 and 10,000 new jobs would be created in the Palestinian construction sector. The Palestinian Authority is responsible for providing off-site infrastructure, while Bayti is tasked with the design and development of the city. According to The Rawabi economic growth strategy, from 3,000 to 5,000 new jobs in "knowledge economy" industries including information technology, pharmaceuticals and health care would result from its development.

On 15 March 2010, two grant agreements were signed by Bashar Masri, Managing Director of Bayti Real Estate Investment Company and chairman of Massar International, and Leocadia I. Zak, Director of the United States Trade and Development Agency (USTDA), in the presence of US Consul General Daniel Rubinstein. The USTDA grants funded two feasibility studies. The first study to develop a master plan for Rawabi's ICT infrastructure and services was won by American management consultancy company Decision/Analysis Partners LLC of Fairfax, Virginia. The second study examined the possibility of building a tertiary waste water treatment facility for Rawabi and surrounding communities. Previously, United States Senator John Kerry visited the construction site on 28 February along with Rubenstein and David Harden, senior advisor to the American special envoy to the Middle East, George J. Mitchell. In 2009 the Palestinian Authority undertook to provide $150 million to cover infrastructural costs for power, water, sewerage, schools and roads, but failed to honour its promise. As a result, purchasers must pick up the tab, which translates into a rise of 10 to 12 percent to the cost of houses.

The development faced a financial crunch in 2014 due to a cash flow crisis when Masri was unable to collect $70 million from homeowners and mortgage banks for the first batch of 600 apartments, because they cannot be delivered until the access road, and a water supply, are given Israeli permits.

== Master plan ==
The Palestinian National Authority did not need Israeli approval for construction since the land for Rawabi falls entirely within Area 'A', which is under full Palestinian control. The Rawabi master plan and Preliminary Design was developed by a Multi-disciplinary team from AECOM led by Raphael Samach (now with SAMACH+SEO), in cooperation with local experts from Birzeit and An-Najah National universities and the technical teams of Bayti. It has been approved by the Palestinian Authority and the Palestinian Higher Planning Council. The design input included concerns to avoid looking like a Palestinian version of an Israeli settlement: indigenous trees are planted; red roofs- the most vigorous aestyhetic symbol of such settlements - are ruled out; defensive walling off of the township ignored, and guard towers are not envisioned.

Constructing the city has created jobs for 8-10,000 Palestinians, a third of them women, and their pay is 30% above the Palestinian minimum wage. The residential areas will surround a city centre that includes banks, shops, petrol stations, offices, eight schools, playgrounds, walking trails, two mosques, a Greek Orthodox church, a hospital, hotel, a seven-screen cinema and numerous other arts venues, in a central piazza lined with arcades and cafes. One third of the engineers and architects are women, a gender participation without precedent in the Arab world. The design envisages an elaborate recycling infrastructure: water towers are not included in buildings, neither are satellite dishes permitted. Water is to be recycled by a computerized system, and any excess will provide watering for the city's parks. The public transport system is to run on electricity, providing free transit to residents, with visitors only being required to pay. Though an industrial zone is planned, with paved roads already leading to the site, permission has yet to be received from the Israeli authorities. A soccer field, and Roman amphitheatre girded by honey-coloured columns, and seating 12,000, has been completed.

The first 700 units were offered for sale in June 2013, with prices ranging from $60,000 to $170,000, 90% of which were sold, according to the developer, within a month. Of the initial purchasers of homes in Rawabi by 2013, 7% were single professional women and 11% were Palestinian Christians. Lisa Goldman, director of the Israel-Palestine Initiative at New America, argues that the project draw attention from the ongoing issues of military occupation, and notes that the home-buyers are middle-class couples earning 20 times more than the average Palestinian income.

== Greening project ==
Thousands of saplings are being planted as part of a greening project which involves growing a forest around the city. The Jewish National Fund is donating 3,000 saplings to the project, the announcement of which sparked some internal Israeli and Jewish controversy. Saplings have also been donated by the Palestinian Ministry of Agriculture and by local and international organisations, corporations and individuals.

== Rawabi Tech Hub ==
In 2017, a "tech hub" opened in Rawabi City. According to the Rawabi City website, "Rawabi's Tech Hub hopes to catalyze and sustain growth in the Palestinian ICT sector with four major initiatives: (1) Attracting local and international ICT companies to establish operations at Rawabi; (2) Establishing the Rawabi Institute for Training and Advancement (RITA): a market-driven, technology-focused training institute; (3) CONNECT, a collaborative workspace for ICT entrepreneurs; (4) BADER, a private equity fund providing venture capital to ICT startups."

As of February 2018, four companies were working at the CONNECT collaborative workspace: WebTeb, an Arabic version of WebMD; Imagry, a developer of automated driving software; Studio 83, a provider of 3D visualization for real estate companies; and an employee of GETAWAY, a German car-sharing startup.

== Access roads ==
Though he obtained Israeli assurances in 2007 that a permit would be granted for a large access road capable of allowing 100 trucks to access the designated construction site weekly, and to cope with the volume of cars expected to be used by its prospective 40,000 residents, it took several years for a permit to be granted, for a much smaller, scaled-back primary access road to transport in building materials. Only in January 2012 was a single access road for trucks approved by Israeli authorities, shortly before a visit by UN Secretary General Ban Ki-moon. The access road for inhabitants still needs to be approved. It needs to pass through Area 'C' and cross Route 465, used mainly by inhabitants of nearby Israeli settlements Ateret and Halamish and Palestinian inhabitants of Birzeit. At the beginning of 2013 a new stretch of road linking 465 road with Ramalla was approved, intended for Palestinian traffic only. As of June 2015, Israel has yet to provide permits for widening the only road to Rawabi as well for other access roads to Nablus and Ramalla.

== Land purchase and water supply ==
The first 600 apartments were sold out by 2013, and were due to be handed over to their Palestinian owners in the spring of 2014. At this point, Israel demanded that the Palestinians meet with the Joint Water Committee to approve the Rawabi project, which the Palestinians were unwilling to do, because they would have been forced to rubber-stamp water projects to settlements. Israel provided water to settlements in spite of this, but refused to do so for Rawabi, preventing new buyers from moving in.

Water has repeatedly proved a contentious issue in negotiations between Israel and the Palestinian Authority. The 600,000 Israeli settlers in the West Bank are serviced with 6 times the quantity of water allocated to the area's 2.7 million Palestinians. A resolution of the issue was promised by August 2014, but Israel did not come through with the requested permit. As a result, the financial viability of the development project came under threat. Permits from Israel to allow the construction of an access road into the city were also lacking until February 2015. Political infighting, with wrangling over whether or not, it was necessary to convene a joint Palestinian-Israeli commission to authorize the final linkage to water, became a key sticking-point. For some years Israeli Defense Minister Moshe Ya'alon placed as a condition for connecting the city to the Mekorot company, that the Israeli-Palestinian Joint Water Committee be convened to issue permits, not only to Rawabi but also to Israeli settlements, a proposal opposed by the Palestinian Authority, which has refused to convene the Committee since 2010 to avoid supplying Palestinian legitimisation of Israel's settlements in the West Bank. Such delays do not occur with Jewish settlement, since Mekorot connects any legal Jewish home in the West Bank to its water mains. Tony Blair, head of the Quartet on the Middle East, who, together with Barack Obama has raised the issue of Israel's failure to supply Rawabi with water connections, has sided with the Palestinians this issue, stating that they have reason to refuse to supply settlements with water in so far as settlements are a key plank in peace negotiations.

Ya'alon relented in early 2015 and approved connecting the city up to Mekorot. The decision was confirmed by Major General Yoav Mordechai, coordinator of Israeli government activities in the Palestinian territories, but the link was further delayed when the Minister of National Infrastructure, Energy and Water, Silvan Shalom, the subject of a fierce letter-writing campaign from Israel's far-right settler lobby, postponed the decision, insisting that due authorization was required from the Joint Israeli-Palestinian Water Committee. In the West Bank, the Defence Minister exercises authority over the pipeline, while the water minister is in charge of the water, and Mekerot would not supply the water unless the Minister for infrastructure authorizes the Water Authority to give the go-ahead. According to both Weissglass and Shlomo Eldar such prior joint committee approval has not been necessary in setting up water connections for Israeli settlements in these territories, though Shalom's Ministry insists that this is a provision set forth in the Oslo Accords. A Haaretz editorial described the refusal to link up the city to water as a form of punishment to achieve diplomatic ends. Even Israeli President Reuven Rivlin urged Israel to give water to Rawabi. The deadlock was broken on 26 February when Israel's Prime Minister Benjamin Netanyahu overruled objections and gave the go ahead for linkage. Masri hailed the decision, commenting: "Now we have our universal right of our water without being pressured for any concessions."

The city now has a state of the art water grid—eventually serviced also by a huge water reservoir roughly half a kilometre outside the city—which is linked to a 2.4-km pipe through areas A and B under Palestinian civil administration. Israel has still to provide permission for the final link to the Israeli water company Mekorot's plant in Umm Safa, 1.1 kilometres across Area C, which is under Israeli military administration. Technically, all new water infrastructure in the West Bank requiring pipes larger than 5 cm requires the approval of the Joint Israeli-Palestinian Water Committee. Israeli Prime Minister Benjamin Netanyahu was also reported to favour connecting the city to the watergrid.

As of June 2016, 250 Palestinian families have taken up residence in Rawabi. Difficulties persist since the pipeline supplies only 300 cubic meters of water per diem, which is below the necessities of the residents and the demands for further construction.

== The right to purchase ==
Asked whether Jews could purchase apartments in Rawabi, al-Masri responded that home-buyers must get permission from the Palestinian Authority, a procedure that can take up to six months. He has no complaint about this because it is designed, he added, to avoid the possibility that "bad Israelis" might buy properties and fly the Israeli flag at their windows. Many Israeli-Arabs have purchased apartments as an investment or for leisure purposes.

== Controversies ==
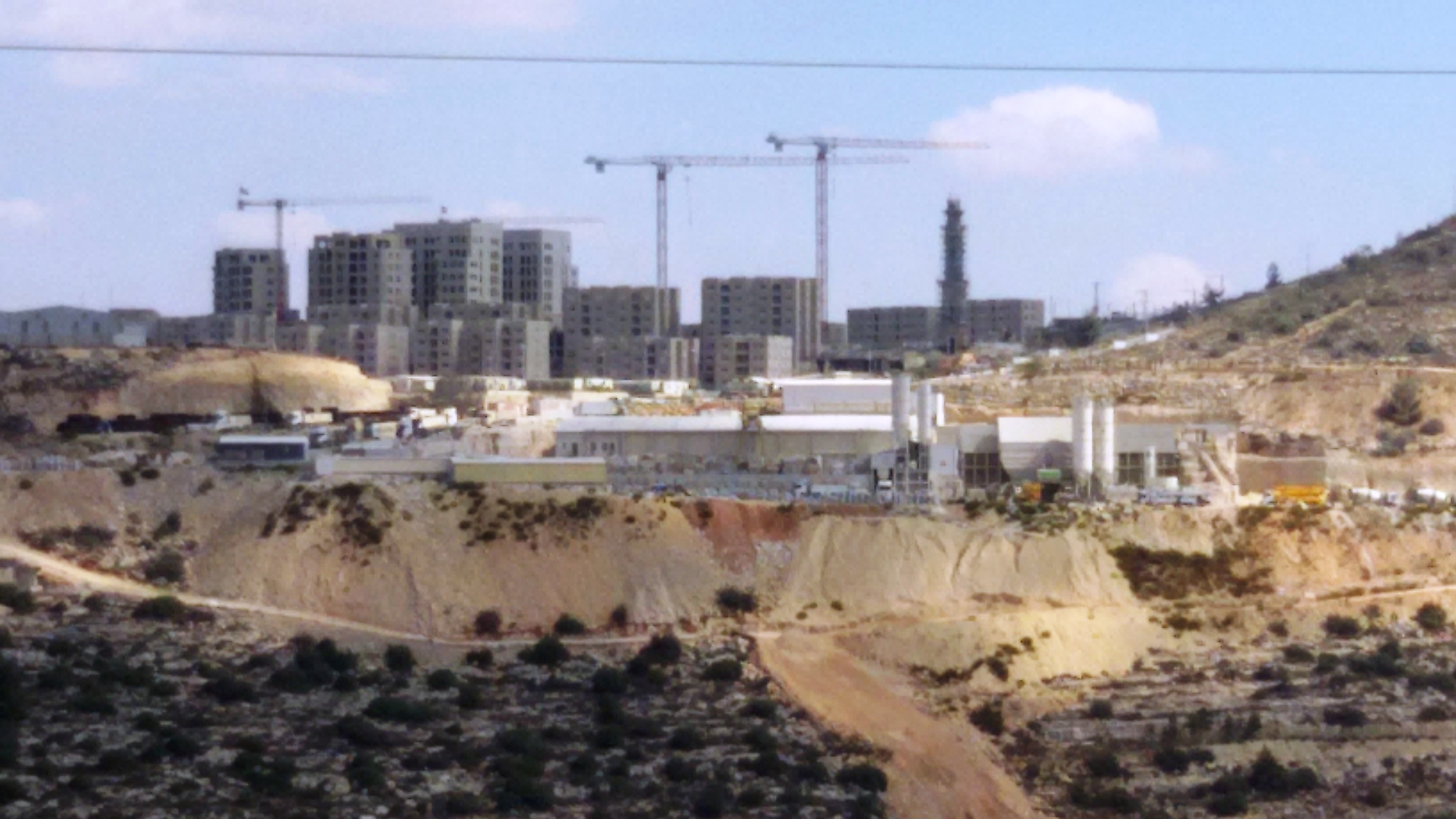
Construction of Rawabi. Industrial area and some of the neighbourhoods. View from Ateret.

William Booth, a writer and bureau chief for the Washington Post, has stated that

Rawabi is the counternarrative in the forever conflict in which Palestinians are often portrayed as terrorist or victim, living in refugee camps or dusty villages out of biblical times.

Masri has been attacked by both sides for undertaking his development. Some Palestinians protest that his approach is "normalizing" Israel's occupation of the West Bank.

In 2010, Israeli settlers held demonstrations to protest the project, although they acknowledged that they could not prevent the city's construction. Some settlers said they would establish settlements nearby.

Masri has repudiated offers of building supplies from settlements, and ignored Israel suggestions as to how Rawabi should be modelled. He has gone on the record as stating

Settlers are evil people in general that continue to harass our people; they continue to live on our land illegally, and it's recognized by almost the whole world as being illegal. We do not deal with illegal bodies or illegal issues.

He has made it a requirement that all contractors working on the project "sign an agreement refusing to use Israeli products originating from the settlements or work in the settlements themselves".

Some Palestinians criticize the development as one that creates the impression that they can enjoy economic prosperity while the Israeli occupation continues. Yousef Munayyer has stated that,"(t)he project creates this illusion that there is this happy space in Palestine that is independent of the military occupation which governs many aspects of Palestinian life." In reply, Masri argues that it is a symbol that defies the occupation, secures Palestinian territory from confiscation for settlements, opens up job opportunities under an otherwise brutal occupation, and blocks the brain drain of talented Palestinians. If, he adds, such a developmental project is, as some critics assert, making the occupation look good, then, "maybe we should live in tents, maybe we should all freeze to death." In designing the project, he didn't think that 'Israel and Palestine would kiss and be happy.'
