= Israeli–Palestinian economic peace efforts =

Israeli–Palestinian economic peace efforts refers to efforts to promote joint economic projects between Israelis and Palestinians, as a pathway to reach peace between the two groups.

It is based partially on official efforts and projects by the governments of Israel and the Palestinian Authority, and partially based on private efforts by individual companies and business people who seek to promote various ventures which promote economic unity and collaboration between the two sides.

== General areas of cooperation and common effort ==
=== Valley of Peace Initiative ===
The Valley of Peace initiative is an effort to promote economic cooperation between Israel, Jordan and the Palestinians, based around efforts and joint projects in the Arava/Arabah Valley, along which runs the southern portion of the Israel–Jordan border. It has received the personal attention and support of Shimon Peres, President of Israel. The initiative involves ongoing joint efforts by regional leaders to launch joint new industrial and economic projects, which will create new local businesses and job growth, and promote ongoing cooperation.

The idea for this project began in 2005, when Israel, Jordan and the Palestinian Authority asked the World Bank to analyze the feasibility of this idea.

The formal proposal for the Valley of Peace initiative began with a joint proposal in 2008 to build a canal between the Red and Dead Seas, desalinating the water, producing hydroelectric power and yielding profits, clean water, jobs and potentially unprecedented regional cooperation. The study concluded in 2013, and an agreement was signed in 2013 by Israel, Jordan, and the Palestinian Authority to move ahead with the plan.

In February 2015, Israel and Jordan signed an agreement to exchange water and jointly convey Red Sea brine to the shrinking Dead Sea. The agreement was reported to be worth about $800 million. It was the result of a memorandum of understanding signed among Israeli, Jordanian and Palestinian officials on December 9, 2013, in Washington. Under this agreement, Jordan and Israel will share the potable water produced by a future desalination plant in Aqaba, while a pipeline will supply saltwater to the Dead Sea.

In December 2015, Israel and Jordan formally released the technical plans to move ahead with this project.

A new desalination plant to be built near the Jordanian tourist resort of Aqaba would convert salt water from the Red Sea into fresh water for use in southern Israel and southern Jordan; each region would get eight billion to 13 billion gallons a year. This process would produces about as much brine as a waste product; the brine would be piped more than 100 miles to help replenish the Dead Sea, already known for its high salt content. This would reinforce the status of the Dead Sea as an important economic resource to both nations, in multiple areas including tourism, industry and business, to create up to a million new jobs in Israel and the West Bank.

=== Industrial parks ===
One component of economic peace efforts is hi-tech industrial parks where Israelis and Palestinians can work together in a cooperative atmosphere. One example is an industrial park in Nazareth by entrepreneur Stef Wertheimer, which was being built in May 2010. Wertheimer has stated, "Coexistence in the industrial park in Arab Nazareth is a good example of coexistence. When people work together, they have no time for nonsense. They're too tired at night to commit terrorist acts. They're satisfied, they engage in producing. They work together, not against each other." Wertheimer has founded four industrial parks in Israel.

"The idea of industrial parks in the Middle East and on the borders between Israel and its neighbors is that the parks will bring industry and provide jobs, which will keep people busy working, instead of engaging in terrorism," explains Wertheimer. One park is the Tefen Industrial Park, which includes everything from transportation to cultural and educational facilities. In April 2013, a new industrial park opened in Nazareth. He has established seven industrial parks – in Tefen, Tel-Hai, Dalton, Lavon and now Nazareth in the Galilee; in Omer in the Negev; and another in Turkey.

== Public statements ==
Benjamin Netanyahu, a former Finance Minister of Israel and the current Prime Minister of Israel has repeatedly made public statements during the 2009 Israeli elections which advocated an approach to peace based on economic cooperation and joint effort, rather than continuous contention over political and diplomatic issues. He raised these ideas during discussions with U.S. Secretary of State Condoleezza Rice. Netanyahu continued to advocate these ideas as the Israeli elections got nearer and plans to execute them after he assumed office.

Netanyahu has said:

Right now, the peace talks are based only one thing, only on peace talks. It makes no sense at this point to talk about the most contractible issue. It's Jerusalem or bust, or right of return or bust. That has led to failure and is likely to lead to failure again....We must weave an economic peace alongside a political process. That means that we have to strengthen the moderate parts of the Palestinian economy by handing rapid growth in those area, rapid economic growth that gives a stake for peace for the ordinary Palestinians.

Similarly, in a Jerusalem Post interview, Tony Blair, the special envoy for the Quartet, said in May 2009:

Question: ... we're hearing about a determination to build from the bottom up with the Palestinians, including assurances that economic projects that had been stymied will now be advanced ...

Blair: ... you have to build from the bottom up as well as negotiate from the top down ... because once you take the three "headings" – politics, economics and security ... Each of these things take decisions ... it will become apparent, whether Israelis are prepared to build from the bottom up, and whether Palestinians understand that Israel will only tolerate a Palestinian state that is a stable and secure neighbor...

... people ask me, why are you bothered about whether there's a bit of agri-industrial thing around Jericho. And I say, because it matters. The detail on the ground really matters. Just supposing you've [created the conditions] in the Jericho area to exploit the [tourism] potential it has got. You're creating a whole set of stake-holders who, when it comes to those difficult concessions, are going to say, "We want the state." They are then believing in a reality, not a shibboleth ...

On December 8, 2015, Israeli President Reuven Rivlin wrote an opinion piece in the Washington Post in which he stated:

Israel must take steps to improve the situation independent of the geopolitical territorial debate – steps that every sensible person understands serve simultaneously Israel’s moral and practical interests. Without resolving the question of whether or not Israel today has a Palestinian partner for peace, it is self-evident that the building of the new Palestinian city, Rawabi, is in Israel’s interest. Likewise, it is clear that cultivating channels of communication and cooperation between Israeli and Palestinian businessmen, educators and cultural figures improves our situation.

== General history ==
In 1995, the first efforts in this area occurred when Palestinian and Israeli officials reached an agreement to create six to nine industrial parks along the "seam" between Israel, Gaza and the West Bank. This was intended to address widespread Palestinian unemployment while bolstering Israel's internal security by reducing the long-term flow of Arab workers into Israel.

=== Governmental planning 2006–2008 ===
In July 2006, Japan announced a plan for peace called "Corridor for Peace and Prosperity", which would be based on common economic development and effort, rather than on continuous contention over land. Shimon Peres gave this idea much attention during his participation in an international conference in New York in September 2006 which was organized by former U.S. President Bill Clinton.

During this period, Turkey formed the Ankara Forum, a meeting process designed to promote cooperation between Israelis and Palestinians. At this group's fourth conference in January 2007, Turkey asserted it would pursue a project to revitalize the Erez Industrial Park in the Gaza Strip.

In March 2007, at a two-day conference in Tokyo which included officials from Japan, Israel and the Palestinian Authority, Japan discussed its plan for peace based on common economic development and effort. Both sides stated their support.

In March 2007, the Israeli Cabinet officially decided to adopt the Peace Valley plan, which would entail promotion of and cooperation on economic development for Palestinians. However, some news reports indicated there was little chance of movement due to lack of attention by Prime Minister Ehud Olmert and the Government of Israel.

In his inaugural speech in July 2007, Peres mentioned this effort, and asserted that there was great potential for cooperation among Israel, Palestinians, and Jordan. He also noted this might mean positive support from Persian Gulf states. In August 2007, Peres met with several Israeli businessmen to discuss ways to press the plan forward. Peres stated that the plan might have many positive effects which might help promote peace.

In August 2007, Foreign Ministers of Israel, Jordan, the Palestinian Authority, and Japan met in Jericho, and formally agreed to go ahead with this plan. A ceremony took place that month in Jericho formally launching the project. it was attended by Israeli Foreign Minister Tzipi Livni, Palestinian negotiator Saeb Erekat, Japanese Foreign Minister Taro Aso and Jordanian Foreign Minister Abdul-Ilah Khatib.

In January 2008, Peres announced that the plan had moved closer to realization, as new details were announced for implementation of joint economic effort in four locations in the West Bank. This included specific plans for industrial projects, and a jointly built university, and investments from several countries, including Japan, Turkey and Germany. Peres discussed this with Tony Blair during Blair's visit to the Mideast in February 2008. Peres said that efforts were moving ahead.

USAID and the World Bank have reviewed many of the specific proposals in depth, and issued a critique of many strengths and weaknesses of the plan. In May 2008 Tony Blair announced a new plan for peace and for Palestinian rights, based heavily on the ideas on the Peace Valley plan.

In May 2008, Peres hosted a conference in celebration of Israel's 60th anniversary, called "Facing Tomorrow". He addressed numerous issues related to Israel's future. He discussed the Peace Valley initiative with numerous foreign leaders. President George Bush expressed support for the idea. Peres said that the initiative could bring lasting peace and transformation to the region. Regarding Palestinians, he said,

They haven't established a proper government and they don't have an army. We can't unite them and we can't divide them. We can't help them politically. We can only help them economically. Today, it's possible to coordinate economic aid with both the Jordanians and the Palestinians.

=== General planning and implementation 2008–2011 ===
In March 2008, Israeli and Palestinian civil defense officials gathered for their first full official meeting in a decade, to discuss further coordination of efforts to further pursue this project.

In May 2008, a major economic international conference was held in Bethlehem, at which various businessmen and local leaders discussed various opportunities for economic development. Several leaders addressed the conference, including the director of the World Bank. The conference was sponsored by various international private companies and some public organizations. Conference sessions covered many details of Palestinian Development. One agricultural entrepreneur noted that Israel is his biggest market, while others speakers noted the need for coordination with Israel to allow further development.

In July 2008, the Japanese government reiterated its support for the plan in meetings with Israelis and Palestinians, and urged the sides to continue working towards completion. Japan also indicated specific support for an agro-industrial park to be built near Jericho, and said it hopes to begin construction by 2009.

The Bethlehem Small Enterprise Center opened in early 2008 with funding from Germany, and has helped Palestinian small businesses in various areas, such as helping printers to improve software and olive wood craftsmen to market their products.

In 2008, the economy in the West Bank improved gradually. Economic growth for the occupied areas reached about 4-5% and unemployment dropped about 3%. Israeli figures indicated that wages in the West Bank rose more than 20% in 2008 and trade rose about 35%. Tourism in Bethlehem increased to about twice its previous levels, and tourism increased by 50% in Jericho. In 2009, an economic boom began with growth reaching 7 percent, higher than in Israel or the West. Tourism to Bethlehem, which had doubled to 1 million in 2008, rose to nearly 1.5 million in 2009. New car imports increased by 44 percent. New shopping malls opened in Jenin and Nablus. Palestinian developers are planning to build the first modern Palestinian city, Rawabi. In October 2008, the Palestinian Authority signed an agreement with the government of Germany, in which Germany donated 13 million euros to start work on the Jenin Industrial Estate. Construction is expected to start by 2009. In late 2008 efforts and discussions continued between local leaders on both sides of the border.

In June 2009, after a meeting with World Bank President Robert Zoellick, the Israeli Regional Cooperation Minister, Silvan Shalom, announced a pilot project to build a "pilot" pipe 180 km long from the Red Sea to the Dead Sea. The pipe would pump 200 million cubic meters per year. Half of this would be desalinated for Jordanian consumption and half put into the Dead Sea. Some experts questioned this project. Hebrew University of Jerusalem Prof. Avner Adin said more studies were needed on the potential environmental impact. However, various groups and government officials from several countries say that the pipeline is needed to save the Dead Sea, which may be in danger of drying up due to some environmental factors.

In early 2010, Shimon Peres took an active and personal role in efforts to promote local business initiatives. Peres personally led a tour of top Israeli executives through the West Bank, and told them about many new Palestinian businesses which show much growth potential. One company highlighted by Peres was the New Generation Technology incubator, a joint Jewish-Arab effort founded in 2002 which encourages new ideas and projects in technology and biotechnology.

=== Status of diplomatic efforts 2013–2015 ===
In 2013, a new agreement was signed for a new industrial zone in Jericho. In 2014, substantial progress was made in building Rawabi, a new city in the West Bank. Many saw this construction as an example of cooperation between Israel and Palestinians, due to Israeli efforts to support this effort through various steps such as providing raw materials.

In November 2015, Israel and the Palestinian Authority signed an agreement to establish a 3G mobile network in the Palestinian territories, with services expected in the Israeli-occupied West Bank by the second half of 2016 and afterwards in Gaza. Prior to that agreement, this had been an issue between the two sides

In 2015, tensions began to rise between the two sides. There was a period of heightened conflict in mid-2015. this was a cause of concern amongst advocates for economic cooperation. Various participants in these efforts expressed concern about the prospects for continuing to develop these efforts, due to some increase of tension in political and diplomatic areas. In late 2015, some Palestinians began to reconsider whether they should continue to adhere to the Paris Protocol, the agreement between Israel and Palestinians which governed economic cooperation between the two sides.

Also in 2015, some Israeli companies began to relocate their factories from settlements built on occupied Palestinian land as a way to circumvent a new EU requirement to label any goods produced in the West Bank.

Some tensions revolved around existing economic projects. One example was the construction of Rawabi, a new city, which Israel partially helped to construct. It was intended to house 40,000 people in its first phase and more in the future; the first 700 homes had already been built by 2015. However, some claimed that conflicts with Israeli authorities had prevented it from having any roads other than a single-lane farm road, and that water access issues had not been resolved.

On December 8, 2015, Israeli President Reuven Rivlin wrote an oped in which he criticized some aspects of the Israeli's government inattention to the economic welfare of Palestinians. He met with President Barack Obama at the White House that week and discussed his ideas for pursuing the peace process.

== Community planning and projects ==
=== Organizational planning and cooperation ===
In 2009, efforts continued to build Palestinian local institutions and governments from the ground up. Much of this work was done by Tony Blair and U.S. General Keith Dayton. Some analysts saw this as a more substantial way to lay a groundwork for viable institutions and for local peace.

The Israeli-Palestinian Chamber of Commerce was founded in 2009. Its chairman is Eival Gilady, and its CEO is Ofir Gendelman. It has already held its first conference, at which Tony Blair was the keynote speaker. It is dedicated to promoting development of joint economic initiatives and businesses.

In early 2010, the Palestine Investment Fund (PIF) launched the first-ever Palestinian private equity fund, in order to raise $50 million to invest in Palestinian businesses. The PIF has a portfolio of about $800 million, and invests in projects such as housing and infrastructure. The PIF operates with its own board but reports to President Mahmoud Abbas. The new private equity fund will try to raise cash from investors to use to help small and medium-sized businesses. These enterprises employ about 85% of Palestinians and contribute to more than half the GDP in the West Bank and Gaza Strip, but lack access to banks and capital markets.

=== Joint efforts and projects, and community endeavors ===
As of 2011, there are about 50 factories in the West Bank industrial region where Jews and Palestinians work together.

=== Local organizations ===
Mejdi is a local grassroots Palestinian organization which was founded by Aziz Abu Sarah, a young Palestinian activist who seeks to advocate cooperation and reconciliation efforts. Mejdi's seeks to promote dialogue between Israelis and Palestinians. one part of its peacemaking efforts is to promote local economic development, and strengthening of Palestinian small businesses. Abu Sarah has been consistently involved in a range of workshops and efforts in which he has promoted greater efforts towards reconciliation and dialogue between individual Israelis and Palestinians.

=== Gilboa and Jenin communities ===
Efforts at joint development and dialogue have also moved forward on the local level in the Jenin area, through ongoing contact between the Israeli Gilboa Regional Council and local Palestinian officials of the Jenin district. Groundbreaking on the Jenin project is hoped to occur by January 2009.

The regional area of Gilboa and Jenin has a long history of cross-border cooperation. In December 2008, community leaders from both sides of the border met to pursue cooperation on a variety of topics.

Joint economic cooperation between Israeli officials in Gilboa and Palestinian officials in Jenin has begun to have major results and benefits. In October 2009, a new project got underway promoting tourism and travel between the two areas. Major new business efforts and tourist attractions have been initiated in Jenin. The two regions are planning a joint industrial zone which would bridge the border. Palestinians would produce locally made handicrafts and sell them through Gilboa to other regions of the world. Another possible project is a joint language center, where Israelis and Palestinians would teach each other Arabic and Hebrew, as well as aspects of their cultural heritage.

== Joint businesses and industrial projects ==
=== Industrial parks ===
Industrial parks are one major product of cooperative efforts. This includes facilities such as Barkan Industrial Park.

=== Groups and companies ===
Olives of Peace is a joint Israeli-Palestinian business venture to sell olive oil. Through this project, Israelis and Palestinians have carried out joint training sessions and planning. It has also led to Palestinian oil production being enriched by Israeli ingredients. It has produced olive oil which has been sold under the brand name "Olives of Peace."

A new computer company composed of both Israelis and Palestinians has received major press coverage in Western media, as a vital new example of joint effort between Israelis and Palestinians. The company G.ho.st has offices in both Modiin and Ramallah. Palestinians have benefited from large amounts of venture capital available through Israeli contacts. Israeli involvement began by benefiting from the labor costs and salary levels in Palestinian society, where various Israeli business have already outsourced some business. Over time, the project became a partnership, owing to a large number of new Palestinian college graduates who studied information science and needed new business opportunities.

Investors as individuals and companies, such as Michael Eisenberg of Benchmark Capital have sought to invest funds based on G.ho.st's long-term goals to create a totally web-based computer environment, free of any need for traditional software applications. Another significant connection has been through Noa Rothman, granddaughter of Yitzhak Rabin, whose organization promotes joint dialogue.

== See also ==
- Israeli–Palestinian peace process
- Arab-Israeli peace projects
- Valley of Peace Initiative
- Arab boycott of Israel
- 2006–07 economic sanctions against the Palestinian National Authority
- Water politics in the Middle East
