= Israeli–Palestinian peace process =

Efforts to resolve the Israeli–Palestinian conflict

Intermittent discussions are held by various parties and proposals put forward in an attempt to resolve the Israeli–Palestinian conflict through a peace process. Since the 1970s, there has been a parallel effort made to find terms upon which peace can be agreed to in both this conflict and the wider Arab–Israeli conflict. Notably, the Camp David Accords between Egypt and Israel included discussions on plans for Palestinian autonomy, but did not include any Palestinian representatives. The autonomy plan was not implemented, but its stipulations were represented to a large extent in the Oslo Accords.

Despite the failure of the peace process to produce a final agreement, the international consensus has for decades supported a two-state solution to the conflict, based on United Nations Security Council Resolution 242 and 338. This includes the establishment of an independent Palestinian state under the pre-1967 borders including East Jerusalem and a resolution to the refugee question based on the Palestinian right of return (in accordance with United Nations General Assembly Resolution 194, though Israel disputes this interpretation). This is in contrast to the current situation under the Oslo Accords in which the Palestinian territories are divided into areas of varying jurisdiction between Israeli military control and the Palestinian National Authority (PA), with the PA only having partial self-rule in Area A of the West Bank and in the Gaza Strip. A final settlement as stipulated by the Oslo Accords has yet to be reached.

== Background ==
For the United States and Israel, the Palestine Liberation Organization (PLO)'s participation in diplomatic negotiations was dependent on its complete disavowal of political violence and full recognition of Israel's "right to exist". This stipulation required the PLO to abandon its objective of reclaiming all of historic Palestine and instead focus on the 22 percent which came under Israeli military control in 1967. By the late 1970s, Palestinian leadership in the occupied territories and most Arab states supported a two-state settlement. In 1981, Saudi Arabia put forward a plan based on a two-state settlement to the conflict with support from the Arab League. Israeli analyst Avner Yaniv describes Arafat as ready to make a historic compromise at this time, while the Israeli cabinet continued to oppose the existence of a Palestinian state. Yaniv described Arafat's willingness to compromise as a "peace offensive" which Israel responded to by planning to remove the PLO as a potential negotiating partner in order to evade international diplomatic pressure. Israel would invade Lebanon the following year in an attempt to undermine the PLO as a political organization, weakening Palestinian nationalism and facilitating the annexation of the West Bank into Greater Israel.

While the PLO had adopted a program of pursuing a Palestinian state alongside Israel since the mid-1970s, the 1988 Palestinian Declaration of Independence formally consecrated this objective. This declaration, which was based on resolutions from the Palestine National Council sessions in the late 1970s and 1980s, advocated for the creation of a Palestinian state comprising the West Bank, Gaza Strip, and East Jerusalem, within the borders set by the 1949 armistice lines prior to June 5, 1967. Following the declaration, Arafat explicitly denounced all forms of terrorism and affirmed the PLO's acceptance of UN Resolutions 242 and 338, as well as the recognition of Israel's right to exist. All the conditions defined by Henry Kissinger for US negotiations with the PLO had now been met.

Israeli prime minister Yitzhak Shamir stood behind the stance that the PLO was a terrorist organization and would not accept it as a negotiating partner. He maintained a strict stance against any concessions, including withdrawal from occupied Palestinian territories, recognition of or negotiations with the PLO, and especially the establishment of a Palestinian state. Shamir viewed the U.S. decision to engage in dialogue with the PLO as a mistake that threatened the existing territorial status quo. He argued that negotiating with the PLO meant accepting the existence of a Palestinian state and hence was unacceptable.

The term "peace-process" refers to the step-by-step approach to resolving the Israeli-Palestinian conflict. Having originally entered into usage to describe the US mediated negotiations between Israel and surrounding Arab countries, notably Egypt, the term "peace-process" has grown to be associated with an emphasis on the negotiation process rather than on presenting a comprehensive solution to the conflict. As part of this process, fundamental issues of the Israeli-Palestinian conflict such as borders, access to resources, and the Palestinian right of return, have been left to "final status" talks. Such "final status" negotiations along the lines discussed in Madrid in 1991 were never concluded.

=== Peace efforts with confrontation states ===
Recognition of Israel only Recognition of both Israel and Palestinian State Recognition of Palestinian State only

There were parallel efforts for peace treaties between Israel and other "confrontation states": Egypt, Jordan and Syria after the Six-Day War, and Lebanon afterwards. UN resolution 242 was accepted by Israel, Jordan, and Egypt, but rejected by Syria until 1972–1973.

In 1970, US Secretary of State William P. Rogers proposed the Rogers Plan, which called for a 90-day cease-fire, a military standstill zone on each side of the Suez Canal, and an effort to reach agreement in the framework of UN Resolution 242. Israel rejected the plan on 10 December 1969, calling it "an attempt to appease [the Arabs] at the expense of Israel". The Soviets dismissed it as "one-sided" and "pro-Israeli". President Nasser rejected it because it was a separate deal with Israel even if Egypt recovered all of Sinai.

== Timeline ==
=== 1949 Armistice Agreements ===
The 1947–1948 civil war in Mandatory Palestine followed by the 1948 Arab–Israeli War all ended with the February–July 1949 Armistice Agreements between Israel and Egypt, Lebanon, Jordan, and Syria. Those Arab countries insisted explicitly in the agreement texts that the agreed Armistice Demarcation Lines ('Green Lines') should not be construed as political or territorial boundaries, thus aiming to safeguard the right of return of those Palestinians that had fled their homes during the war, and the illegitimacy of Israel's use or appropriation of abandoned Palestinian property.

After the 1967 Six-Day War, in which Israel had conquered, among more, the Palestinian West Bank and Gaza Strip in a pre-emptive surprise-strike against overtly hostile Arab neighbouring countries, top Israeli leaders like Golda Meir, Menachem Begin and Abba Eban have emphasized that returning to the pre-1967 borders would be extremely dangerous for Israel, bordering on "national suicide".

=== Geneva, December 1973 ===
After the ceasefire on 25 October 1973 ending the Yom Kippur War (surprise attack on Israel on 6 October by Egypt, Syria, Jordan, Iraq assisted by more countries), the U.S. and U.S.S.R. gathered the foreign ministers of Israel, Egypt and Jordan in Geneva in December 1973 to pursue "peace", firstly disengagement of armed forces, towards fulfilling UNSC Resolution 242 dating from 1967 ("…the need to work for a just and lasting peace in the Middle East in which every State in the area can live in security"). Syria had refused to show up because Israel and the US refused to invite the PLO. The short conference facilitated a reconciliation between Israel, Egypt, and Syria, but achieved nothing for the Palestinians.

=== Camp David, 1978 ===
A political agreement was signed between Israel and Egypt (notably excluding representatives from the PLO) in 1978, aiming to establish a self-governing authority in the West Bank and Gaza and autonomy for the inhabitants of those lands, as an attempt towards "Peace in the Middle East". "Autonomy" in this case would not mean "self-determination"; Israeli Prime Minister Menachem Begin specifically insisted that "on no condition will there be a Palestinian state".

Meanwhile, Egypt's status as the strongest Arab nation capable of challenging Israel militarily meant that its parallel withdrawal from the Arab-Israeli conflict in the Egypt–Israel peace treaty (March 1979) significantly weakened the collective military and diplomatic power of the other Arab countries. It has been argued that this shift essentially eliminated Israel's motivation to make concessions in the West Bank, Gaza, or other areas.

=== Madrid (1991–1993) ===
Delegations from Israel, Syria, Lebanon, and Jordan accepted the invitation from US President George H. W. Bush and the Soviet Union president Mikhail Gorbachev to attend the Madrid Conference of 1991, after the First Gulf War.

=== Oslo (1993–2001) ===
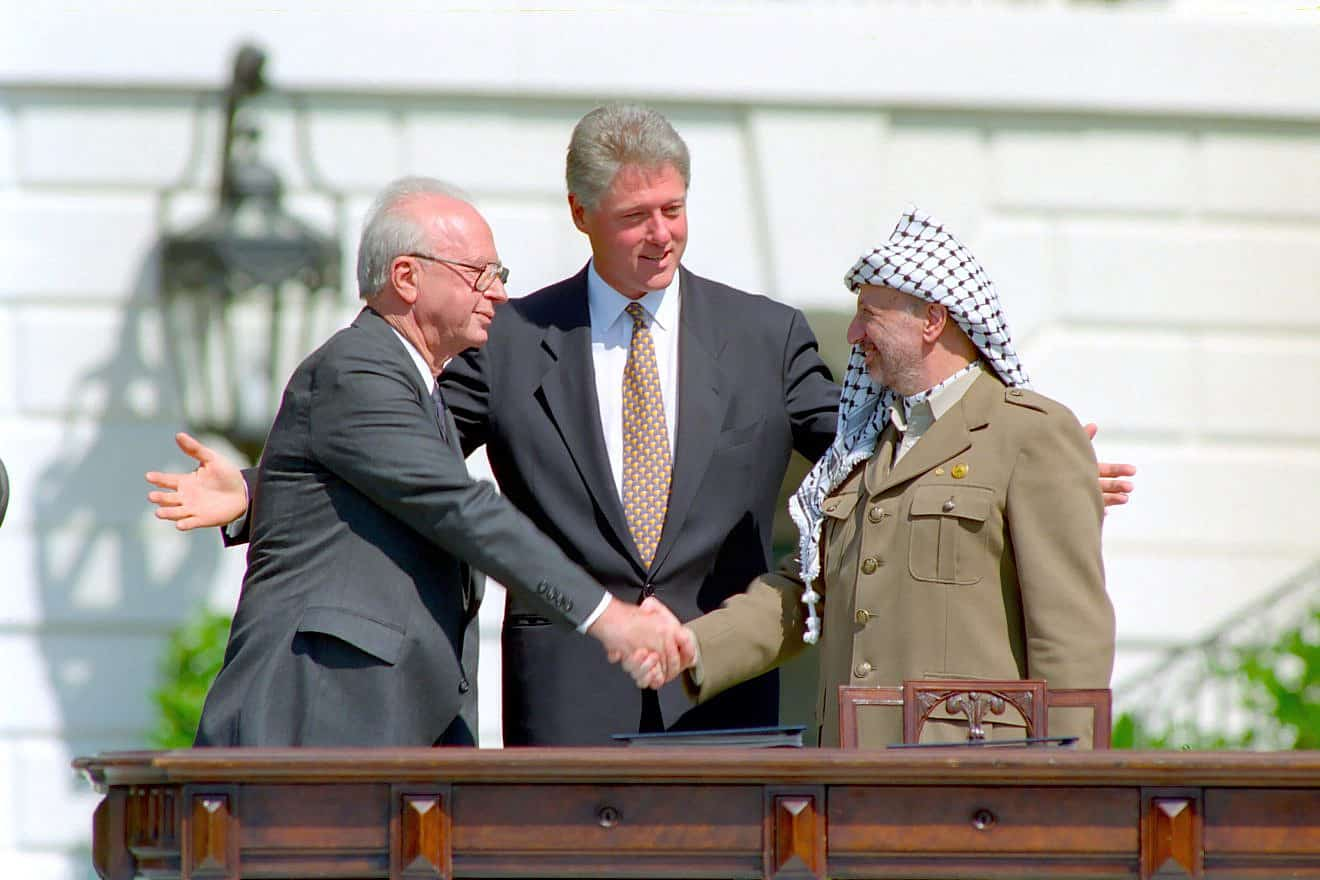
Yitzhak Rabin, Bill Clinton, and Yasser Arafat at the Oslo Accords signing ceremony on 13 September 1993

While the slow moving Madrid talks were taking place, a series of secret meetings between Israeli and Palestinian negotiators were taking place in Oslo, Norway, which resulted in the 1993 Oslo Peace Accords between Palestinians and Israel, a plan discussing the necessary elements and conditions for a future Palestinian state "on the basis of Security Council Resolutions 242 and 338". The agreement, officially titled the Declaration of Principles on Interim Self-Government Arrangements (DOP), was signed on the White House lawn on 13 September 1993. The stipulations of the Oslo agreements were criticized as diverging from prevailing interpretations of how the conflict should be resolved; critics argued that the agreements failed to guarantee Palestinian self-determination or statehood and departed from one interpretation of UN Resolution 242, which holds that land cannot be acquired by war. Political analyst Noam Chomsky argued that the Oslo agreements allowed Israel "to do virtually what it likes". Other observers, however, viewed the accords as a breakthrough that created a framework for mutual recognition and negotiations.

Various "transfers of power and responsibilities" in the Gaza Strip and West Bank from Israel to the Palestinians took place in the mid-1990s. Israeli foreign minister Shlomo Ben-Ami described the Oslo Accords as legitimizing "the transformation of the West Bank into what has been called a 'cartographic cheeseboard'". Indeed, Oslo legitimized the fragmentation of Palestinian population centers by Jewish-only settlements and bypass roads, Israeli checkpoints, and military installations. Core to the Oslo Accords was the creation of the Palestinian Authority and the security cooperation it would enter into with the Israeli military authorities. Ben-Ami, who participated in the Camp David 2000 talks, described this process: "One of the meanings of Oslo was that the PLO was eventually Israel's collaborator in the task of stifling the Intifada and cutting short what was clearly an authentically democratic struggle for Palestinian independence."

After the assassination of Yitzhak Rabin in 1995, the peace process eventually ground to a halt. The settlements' population almost doubled in the West Bank. Later suicide bombing attacks from Palestinian militant groups and the subsequent retaliatory actions from the Israeli military made conditions for peace negotiations untenable.

=== 1996–1999 agreements ===
Newly elected Prime Minister Benjamin Netanyahu declared a new policy following the many suicide attacks by Hamas and Palestinian Islamic Jihad since 1993, including a wave of suicide attacks before the Israeli elections of May 1996. Netanyahu declared a tit-for-tat policy which he termed "reciprocity", whereby Israel would not engage in the peace process if Arafat continued with what Netanyahu defined as the Palestinian revolving door policy, i.e., incitement and direct or indirect support of terrorism. The Hebron and Wye Agreements were signed during this period, after Israel considered that its conditions were partially met.

The Protocol Concerning the Redeployment in Hebron, also known as the Hebron Protocol or Hebron Agreement, began on 7 January and was concluded between Israel and the PLO from 15 to 17 January 1997. The agreement dealt with the redeployment of Israeli military forces in Hebron in accordance with the Oslo Accords, security issues, and other concerns.

The Wye River Memorandum was a political agreement negotiated to implement the Oslo Accords, completed on 23 October 1998. It was signed by Israeli Prime Minister Benjamin Netanyahu and PLO Chairman Yasser Arafat. It was negotiated at Wye River, Maryland (at the Wye River Conference Center) and signed at the White House with President Bill Clinton as the official witness. On 17 November 1998, Israel's 120-member parliament, the Knesset, approved the Memorandum by voting 75–19. The agreement dealt with further redeployments in the West Bank, security issues, and other concerns. Major international human rights organizations criticized the memorandum for its "encouragement" of human rights abuses.

=== Camp David 2000 Summit, Clinton's "Parameters", and the Taba talks ===
In 2000, US President Bill Clinton convened a peace summit between Palestinian President Yasser Arafat and Israeli Prime Minister Ehud Barak. In May of that year, according to Nathan Thrall, Israel had offered Palestinians 66% of the West Bank, with 17% annexed to Israel, and a further 17% not annexed but under Israeli control, and no compensating swap of Israeli territory. The Israeli prime minister offered the Palestinian leader between 91% (Note: The 91% land offer was based on the Israeli definition of the West Bank, but this differs by approximately 5 percentage points from the Palestinian definition. Palestinians use a total area of 5,854 square kilometers. Israel, however, omits the area known as No Man's Land (50 km^{2} near Latrun), post-1967 East Jerusalem (71 km^{2}), and the territorial waters of the Dead Sea (195 km^{2}), which reduces the total to 5,538 km^{2}. Thus, an Israeli offer of 91% (of 5,538 km^{2}) of the West Bank translates into only 86% from the Palestinian perspective. Jeremy Pressman, International Security, vol 28, no. 2, Fall 2003, "Visions in Collision: What Happened at Camp David and Taba?". On. See pp. 16–17) and 95% (sources differ on the exact percentage) of the West Bank and the entire Gaza Strip if 69 Jewish settlements (which comprise 85% of the West Bank's Jewish settlers) were ceded to Israel. East Jerusalem would have fallen for the most part under Israeli sovereignty, with the exception of most suburbs with heavy non-Jewish populations surrounded by areas annexed to Israel. The issue of the Palestinian right of return would be solved through significant monetary reparations.

Arafat rejected this offer and did not propose a counteroffer. No tenable solution was crafted which would satisfy both Israeli and Palestinian demands, even under intense U.S. pressure. Clinton blamed Arafat for the failure of the Camp David Summit. In the months following the summit, Clinton appointed former US Senator George J. Mitchell to lead a fact-finding committee that later published the Mitchell Report.

Proposed in the fall of 2000 following the collapse of the Camp David talks, The Clinton Parameters included a plan on which the Palestinian State was to include 94-96% of the West Bank. Around 80% of the settlers were to become under Israeli sovereignty. In exchange for that, Israel would concede some territory (so-called 'Territory Exchange' or 'Land Swap') within the Green Line (1967 borders). The swap would consist of 1–3% of Israeli territory, such that the final borders of the West Bank part of the Palestinian state would include 97% of the land of the original borders.

At the Taba summit (at Taba) in January 2001, talks continued based on the Clinton Parameters. The Israeli negotiation team presented a new map. The proposition removed the "temporarily Israeli-controlled" areas from the West Bank and offered a few thousand more refugees than they offered at Camp David to settle into Israel, and hoped that this would be considered "implementation" of United Nations General Assembly Resolution 194. The Palestinian side accepted this as a basis for further negotiation. However, Barak did not conduct further negotiations at that time; the talks ended without an agreement, and the following month, the right-wing Likud party candidate Ariel Sharon was elected Israeli prime minister in February 2001.

=== The Arab peace initiative and the Roadmap (2002-03) ===
The Beirut summit of Arab government leaders took place in March 2002 under the aegis of the Arab League. The summit concluded by presenting a plan to end the Israeli-Palestinian conflict. Israeli Foreign Minister Shimon Peres welcomed it and said, "... the details of every peace plan must be discussed directly between Israel and the Palestinians, and to make this possible, the Palestinian Authority must put an end to terror, the horrifying expression of which we witnessed just last night in Netanya", referring to the Netanya suicide attack perpetrated on the previous evening which the Beirut Summit failed to address. Israel was not prepared to enter negotiations as called for by the Arab League plan on the grounds that it did not wish for "full withdrawal to 1967 borders and the right of return for the Palestinian refugees".

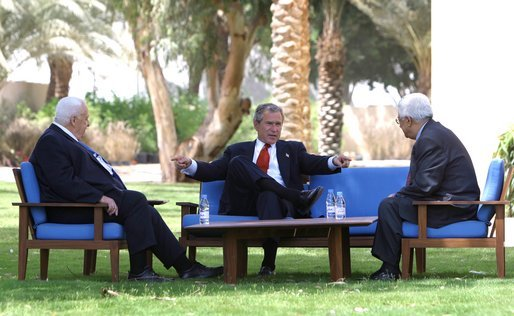
President George W. Bush, center, discusses the peace process with Prime Minister Ariel Sharon of Israel, left, and Palestinian President Mahmoud Abbas in Aqaba, Jordan, 4 June 2003.

=== Israeli–Palestinian talks in 2007 and 2008 ===
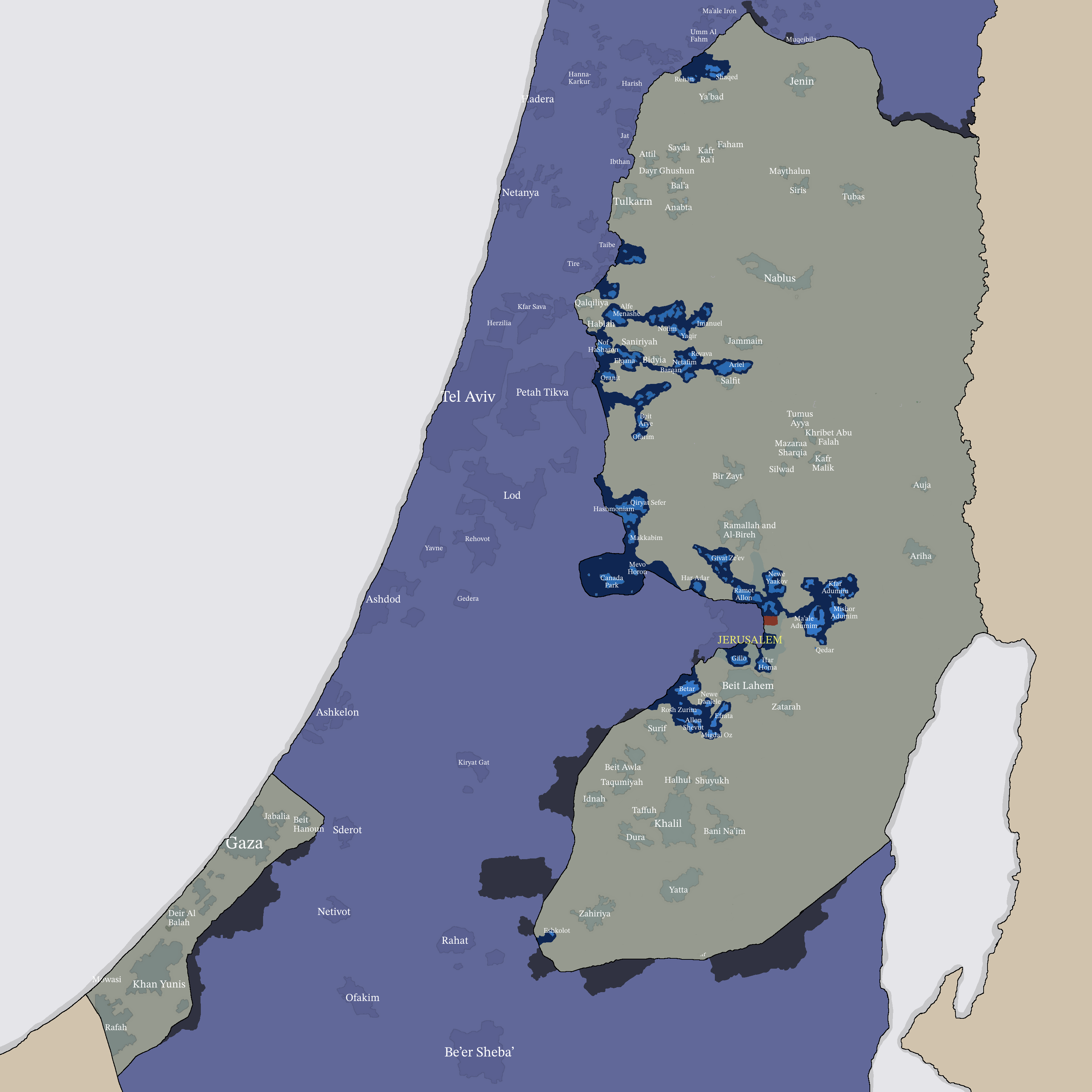
Olmert plan, publicised by Israeli Prime Minister Ehud Olmert in 2008

From December 2006 to mid-September 2008, Israeli Prime Minister Ehud Olmert and President Mahmoud Abbas of the Palestinian Authority met 36 times; there were also lower-level talks. In 2007, Olmert welcomed the Arab League's re-endorsement of the Arab Peace Initiative. In his bid to negotiate a peace accord and establish a Palestinian state, Olmert proposed a plan to the Palestinians. The centerpiece of Olmert's detailed proposal is the suggested permanent border, which would be based on an Israeli withdrawal from most of the West Bank. Olmert proposed annexing at least 6.3% of Palestinian territory, in exchange for 5.8% of Israeli land, with Palestinians receiving alternative land in the Negev, adjacent to the Gaza Strip, as well as a territorial link, under Israeli sovereignty, for free passage between Gaza and the West Bank. Israel insisted on retaining an armed presence in the future Palestinian state. Under Abbas's offer, more than 60 percent of settlers would stay in place. For his part, Olmert presented a plan in which the most sparsely populated settlements would be evacuated. Olmert and Abbas both acknowledged that reciprocal relations would be necessary, not hermetic separation. They also acknowledged the need to share a single business ecosystem, while cooperating intensively on water, security, bandwidth, banking, tourism, and much more. Regarding Jerusalem the leaders agreed that Jewish neighborhoods should remain under Israeli sovereignty and Arab neighborhoods would revert to Palestinian sovereignty. The Palestinians asked for clarifications of the territorial land swap since they were unable to ascertain what land his percentages affected, since Israeli and Palestinian calculations of the West Bank differ by several hundred square kilometres. For them, in lieu of such clarifications, Olmert's 6.3–6.8% annexation might work out closer to 8.5%, 4 times the 1.9% limit the Palestinians argued a swap should not exceed. The talks ended with both sides claiming the other side dropped follow-up contacts.

An attempt to change the rules was made by Condoleezza Rice and Tzipi Livni when they brought forth the concept of a "shelf agreement." The idea was to disengage the linkage between negotiations and actions on the ground. In theory this would allow negotiations until an agreement defining peace would be obtained. Such an agreement would not entail implementation. It would just describe what peace is. It would stay on the shelf but eventually will guide the implementation. The difficulty with this notion is that it creates a dis-incentive for Israel to reach such an agreement. The lack of clarity about what happens after agreement is reached will result in insurmountable pressures on Abbas to demand immediate implementation. However, from the Israeli point of view, the Palestinians are not ready to create a stable state, such an implementation process will almost guarantee instability in the Palestinian areas with a possible Hamas takeover as happened in Gaza. The idea went nowhere as an official negotiation, but the Geneva Initiative continued on an unofficial path, a path encouraged by Mahmoud Abbas.

Egypt brokered the 2008 Israel–Hamas ceasefire, which lasted half a year beginning on 19 June 2008 and lasted until 19 December 2008. The collapse of the ceasefire led to the Gaza War on 27 December 2008.

=== 2010 direct talks ===
In June 2009, reacting to US President Barack Obama's Cairo Address, Israeli Prime Minister Benjamin Netanyahu declared for the first time conditional support for a future Palestinian state but insisted that the Palestinians would need to make reciprocal gestures and accept several principles: recognition of Israel as the nation-state of the Jewish people; demilitarization of a future Palestinian state, along with additional security guarantees, including defensible borders for Israel; acceptance that Jerusalem would remain the united capital of Israel; and renunciation of their claim to a right of return. He also claimed that Israeli settlements retain the right to growth and expansion in the West Bank. Palestinians rejected the proposals immediately. In September 2010, the Obama administration pushed to revive the stalled peace process by getting the parties involved to agree to direct talks for the first time in about two years. While U.S. President Barack Obama was the orchestrator of the movement, U.S. Secretary of State Hillary Clinton went through months of cajoling just to get the parties to the table, and helped convince the reluctant Palestinians by getting support for direct talks from Egypt and Jordan. The aim of the talks was to forge the framework of a final agreement within one year, although general expectations of a success were fairly low. The talks aimed to put the Israeli–Palestinian conflict to an official end by forming a two-state solution for the Jewish and Palestinian peoples, promoting the idea of everlasting peace, and putting an official halt to any further land claims, as well as accepting the rejection of any forceful retribution if violence should recur. Hamas and Hezbollah, however, threatened violence, especially if either side seemed likely to compromise in order to reach an agreement. As a result, the Israeli government publicly stated that peace couldn't exist even if both sides signed the agreement, due to the stance taken by Hamas and Hezbollah. The US was therefore compelled to re-focus on eliminating the threat posed by the stance of Hamas and Hezbollah as part of the direct talks process. Israel, for its part, was skeptical that a final agreement would change the situation, as Hamas and Hezbollah would still get support to fuel new violence. In addition, the Israeli government rejected any possible agreement with Palestine as long as it refuses to recognize Israel as a Jewish state.

Since 1982, the mainstream within the PLO had shown interest in mutual recognition and a Palestinian state. During the 2010 talks, Palestinian Authority President Mahmoud Abbas said that the Palestinians and Israel had agreed on the principle of a land swap, but Israel had yet to confirm. The issue of the ratio of land Israel would give to the Palestinians in exchange for keeping settlement blocs was an issue of dispute, with the Palestinians demanding that the ratio be 1:1, and Israel offering less. In April 2012, Mahmoud Abbas sent a letter to Benjamin Netanyahu reiterating that for peace talks to resume, Israel must stop settlement building in the West Bank, including East Jerusalem, and accept the 1967 borders as a basis for a two-state solution. In May 2012, Abbas reiterated his readiness to engage with the Israelis if they propose "anything promising or positive". Netanyahu replied to Abbas' April letter less than a week later and, for the first time, officially recognised the right for Palestinians to have their own state, though as before he declared it would have to be demilitarised, and said his new national unity government furnished a new opportunity to renew negotiations and move forward.

=== 2013–14 talks ===
In August 2013, Mahmud Abbas in a meeting with Meretz MK-s welcomed final status negotiations. In the meeting Abbas stated "that there cannot be an interim agreement but only a final status deal that can be implemented in stages." Direct negotiations between Israel and the Palestinians began on 29 July 2013 following United States Secretary of State John Kerry's commitment to restart the peace process.

Martin Indyk of the Brookings Institution in Washington, D.C., was appointed by the US to oversee the negotiations. Indyk served as U.S. ambassador to Israel and assistant secretary of state for Near East affairs during the Clinton administration. Hamas, the Palestinian government in Gaza, rejected Kerry's announcement, stating that Palestinian president Mahmoud Abbas has no legitimacy to negotiate in the name of the Palestinian people.

The negotiations were scheduled to last up to nine months to reach a final status to the Palestinian-Israeli conflict by mid-2014. The Israeli negotiating team was led by veteran negotiator Justice Minister Tzipi Livni, while the Palestinian delegation was led by Saeb Erekat, also a former negotiator. Negotiations started in Washington, DC and were slated to move to the King David Hotel in Jerusalem and finally to Hebron. A deadline was set for establishing a broad outline for an agreement by 29 April 2014. On the expiry of the deadline, negotiations collapsed, with the US Special Envoy Indyk reportedly assigning blame mainly to Israel. The US State Department insisted no one side was to blame but that "both sides did things that were incredibly unhelpful".

Israel reacted angrily to the Fatah–Hamas Gaza Agreement of 23 April 2014, whose main purpose was reconciliation between Fatah and Hamas, the formation of a Palestinian unity government, and the holding of new elections. Israel halted peace talks with the Palestinians, saying it "will not negotiate with a Palestinian government backed by Hamas, a terrorist organization that calls for Israel's destruction", and threatened sanctions against the Palestinian Authority, including a previously announced Israeli plan to unilaterally deduct Palestinian debts to Israeli companies from the tax revenue Israel collects for the PA. Israeli Prime Minister Benjamin Netanyahu accused Abbas of sabotaging peace efforts. He said that Abbas cannot have peace with both Hamas and Israel and has to choose. Abbas said the deal did not contradict their commitment to peace with Israel on the basis of a two-state solution and assured reporters that any unity government would recognize Israel, be non-violent, and bound to previous PLO agreements. Shortly after, Israel began implementing economic sanctions against Palestinians and canceled plans to build housing for Palestinians in Area C of the West Bank. Abbas also threatened to dissolve the PA, leaving Israel fully responsible for both the West Bank and Gaza, a threat that the PA has not put into effect.

Notwithstanding Israeli objections and actions, the new Palestinian Unity Government was formed on 2 June 2014.

=== Abbas' 2014 peace plan ===
On 3 September 2014, Abbas presented a new proposal for the peace process to John Kerry. The plan called for nine months of direct talks followed by a three-year plan for Israel to withdraw to the 1967 lines, leaving East Jerusalem as Palestine's capital. The resumption of talks was contingent on an Israeli freeze on construction in the West Bank and east Jerusalem, as well as the release of the final batch of prisoners from the previous talks. The first three months of the plan would revolve around the borders and potential land swaps for the 1967 lines. The following six months would focus on issues including refugees, Jerusalem, settlements, security and water. The US administration rejected the initiative, saying it was opposed to any unilateral move that could negatively impact the Israeli–Palestinian peace process.

Abbas stated that if Israel rejected the claim he would push for charges against Israel in the International Criminal Court over the 2014 Israel–Gaza conflict. Additionally, if rejected, Abbas stated he would turn to the UN Security Council for a unilateral measure for a Palestinian State. On 1 October 2014, Abbas stated he would be presenting his plan to the UNSC within two to three weeks, with an application to the ICC to follow if it failed to pass the UNSC. Later that month as previously threatened, Abbas signed the treaty to join the ICC. Israel responded by freezing NIS 500 million (US$127 million) in Palestinian tax revenues, in response to which, the PA banned the sale in the Palestinian territories of products of six major Israeli companies.

=== Trump plan ===
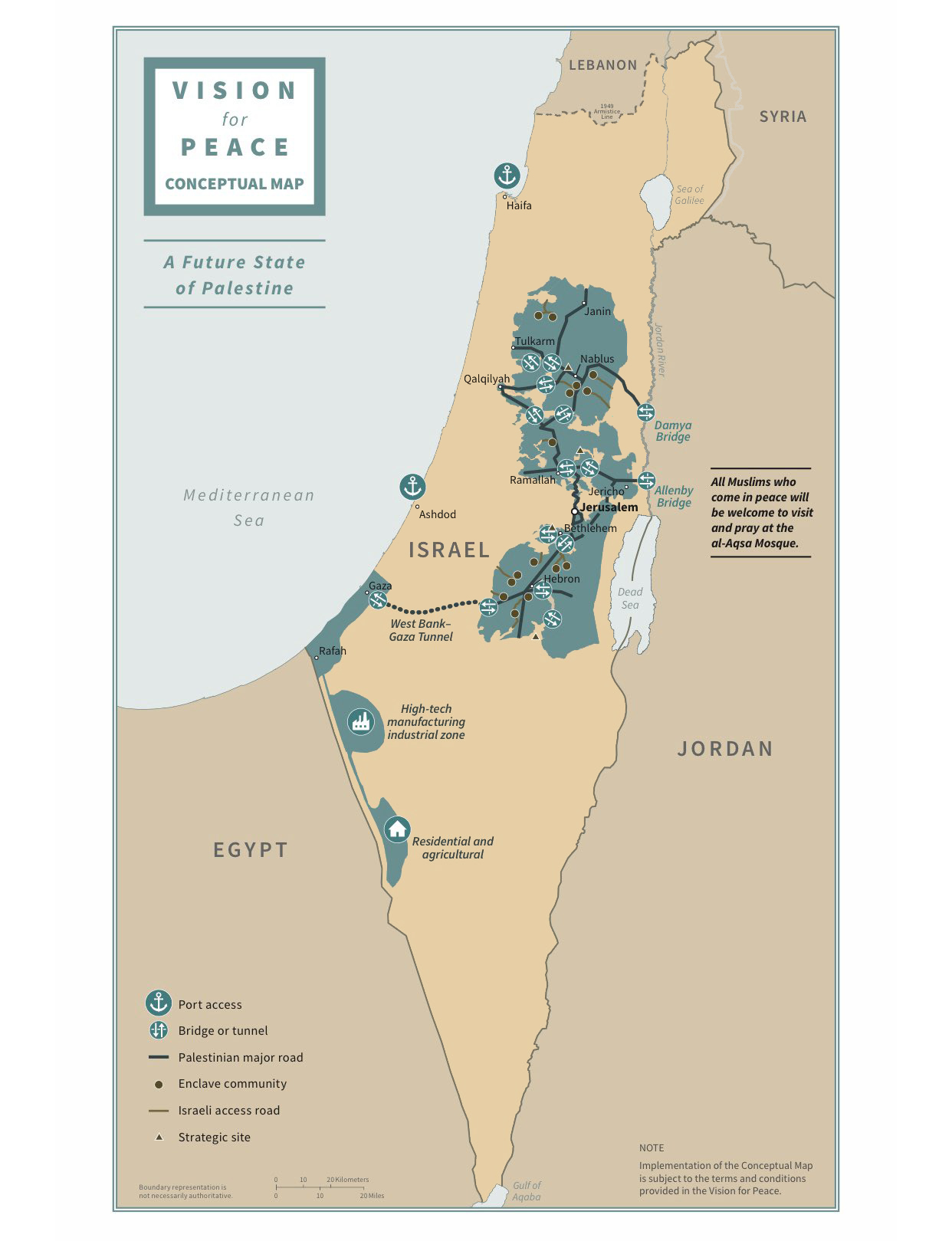
Trump plan map

Following the inauguration of US President Donald Trump in January 2017, a period of uncertainty regarding a new peace initiative began. In early 2018, some media sources reported that the new administration was preparing a new peace initiative for an Israeli-Palestinian deal. The White House unveiled the economic part of the Trump initiative, titled Peace to Prosperity: The Economic Plan, in June 2019, and the political portion of the plan in January 2020. Palestinian leaders boycotted and condemned the Bahrain conference in late June 2019 at which the economic plan was unveiled.

In December 2017, Palestinian president Mahmoud Abbas cut ties with the Trump administration after United States recognition of Jerusalem as capital of Israel. The Trump administration further raised Palestinians' ire when it moved the US embassy to Jerusalem in May 2018, and cut hundreds of millions of dollars in annual aid to the Palestinians, citing the PA's refusal to take part in the administration's peace initiative.

=== Munich group ===
In February 2020, on the sidelines of the Munich Security Conference, the foreign ministers of Egypt, France, Germany, and Jordan, the Munich Group, together discussed peace efforts. In July, the same quartet issued a statement declaring that "any annexation of Palestinian territories occupied in 1967 would be a violation of international law" and "would have serious consequences for the security and stability of the region and would constitute a major obstacle to efforts aimed at achieving a comprehensive and just peace". The foreign ministers said they "discussed how to restart a fruitful engagement between the Israeli and the Palestinian side, and offer our support in facilitating a path to negotiations".

Meeting in Jordan on 24 September, the four again called for a resumption of negotiations between the two sides. There will be "no comprehensive and lasting peace without solving the conflict on the basis of the two-state solution", Jordanian Foreign Minister Ayman al-Safadi told reporters following the meeting. The four also praised recent deals establishing ties between Israel and the United Arab Emirates and Bahrain. Egypt's Sameh Shoukry said the deals are an "important development that would lead to more support and interaction in order to reach a comprehensive peace". However, Palestinians see the two accords as a betrayal.

On 11 January 2021, the group met in Cairo to discuss "possible steps to advance the peace process in the Middle East and create an environment conducive to the resumption of dialogue between the Palestinians and the Israelis". A joint statement of the quartet confirmed its intention to work with the incoming administration of President-elect Joe Biden. A further meeting is set to be held in Paris.

The four met in Paris on 11 March 2021, with United Nations Special Coordinator for the Middle East Peace Process Tor Wennesland and the European Union Special Representative for the Middle East Peace Process, Susanna Terstal. Their statement emphasized the importance of confidence-building measures to promote dialogue and support the two-state solution, and stated that settlement activities violate international law.

On 19 February 2021, at the Munich Security Conference, as well as reaffirming support for a two state solution, the group condemned the expansion of Israeli settlements and the ongoing Palestinian displacement in East Jerusalem, in particular in Sheikh Jarrah.

On 22 September 2022, the group met with Josep Borrell, High Representative of the European Union for Foreign Affairs and Security Policy, and the United Nations Special Coordinator for the Middle East Peace Process, Tor Wennesland, and in a statement said "with a view to advancing the Middle East Peace Process towards a just, comprehensive and lasting peace on the basis of the two-state solution".

=== Quartet developments ===
In July 2016, the Quartet reported:

The continuing policy of settlement construction and expansion in the West Bank and East Jerusalem, designation of land for exclusive Israeli use, and denial of Palestinian development, including the recent high rate of demolitions, is steadily eroding the viability of the two-state solution. This raises legitimate questions about Israel's long-term intentions, which are compounded by the statements of some Israeli ministers that there should never be a Palestinian state. In fact, the transfer of greater powers and responsibilities to Palestinian civil authority...has effectively been stopped.

It was within this context that the United Nations passed Security Council Resolution 2334 in December 2016 in another bid to address the settlement question. The report was significantly altered to appease Israel and as well as urging Israel to stop its settlement policy, urged Palestine to end incitement to violence.

In a speech to the UN General Assembly in September 2018, Mahmoud Abbas called Donald Trump's policies towards Palestinians an "assault on international law". He said the US is "too biased towards Israel", indicating that others could broker talks and that the US could participate as a member of the Middle East peace Quartet. Abbas reiterated this position at a UN Security Council meeting on 11 February 2020.

As of 16 September 2020, the UN has not been able to gather the consensus necessary for the Quartet or a group of countries linked to the Quartet to meet. On 25 September 2020, at the UN, Abbas called for an international conference early in 2021 to "launch a genuine peace process".

On 15 February 2021, the quartet envoys met virtually and agreed to meet regularly to continue their engagement. On 23 March 2021, the Quartet discussed the reviving of "meaningful negotiations" between Israel and the Palestinians who both need "to refrain from unilateral actions that make a two-state solution more difficult to achieve".

=== Gaza peace plan ===
After the 2005 Israeli disengagement from the Gaza Strip, Hamas won elections in 2006 and formed a government, first alone and then in a grand coalition with Fatah, but later seized Gaza in 2007. Since then, repeated clashes with Israel have escalated into major conflicts. A lack of major conflicts after 2014 coincided with the Trump and Biden Administrations' attempts to induce Saudi Arabia into joining the Abraham Accords. The fear that Saudi Arabia joining the Abraham Accords would sink the Palestinian cause may be one reason that Hamas launched the October 7 attack. The attack triggered a large-scale Israeli military campaign and genocide in Gaza and scuttled the pending U.S. agreement with Saudi Arabia.

After an interim ceasefire in late 2023 collapsed, Saudi Arabia and France launched a diplomatic initiative to end both the war and the Israeli-Palestinian conflict. This joint effort culminated in a July 2025 UN conference and a UN General Assembly vote in September, 2025. The conference presented a 42-point declaration to end the Israeli-Palestinian conflict that condemned Hamas and called for a Palestinian state. On September 12, 2025, the United Nations General Assembly passed a non-binding resolution endorsing the "New York Declaration" in a 142–10 vote. Both the U.S. and Israel voted against the declaration. Not wanting the Trump Administration to be upstaged, Jared Kushner had instead contracted with the Tony Blair Institute for Global Change to develop the administration's own, slightly different plan to end the war and the conflict. That led to the Gaza peace plan the Trump Administration presented to Israel, Hamas, and the world.

The Gaza peace plan is a multi-part agreement among Israel, Hamas, and the United Nations that aims to end the ongoing Gaza war and broader Middle Eastern crisis. Brokered by Egypt, Qatar, Turkey, and United States, a cease-fire agreement was signed on October 9, coming into effect the following day, and a 20-point peace plan was endorsed by the United Nations Security Council on November 17.

The Gaza peace plan calls for an immediate ceasefire, the return of all hostages, prisoner exchanges, and eventually the demilitarization of the Gaza Strip, the deployment of an International Stabilization Force, transitional governance by Palestinian technocrats under international supervision, large-scale reconstruction, and a conditional pathway toward acceptance of Palestinian self-determination and a Palestinian state. Although not involved in the negotiations, the Palestinian Authority expressed support for the deal. Prior to Trump's announcement of the plan, Hamas had maintained that it will not disarm without the establishment of an independent Palestinian state.

== Views of the peace process ==
=== Palestinian views on the peace process ===
Palestinians trace their struggle to the 1948 Arab–Israeli war and the Palestinian refugees it created. By the late 1970s, most Palestinian leaders and Arab states had come to support a two-state solution alongside Israel. The PLO gradually moved from calls for the "destruction" of Israel toward acceptance of coexistence with Israel. But the right of return for refugees has remained central to Palestinian positions. Continuing Israeli settlement activity in the West Bank has been cited by Palestinians and international observers as a major obstacle to realizing a future Palestinian state.

=== Israeli views on the peace process ===
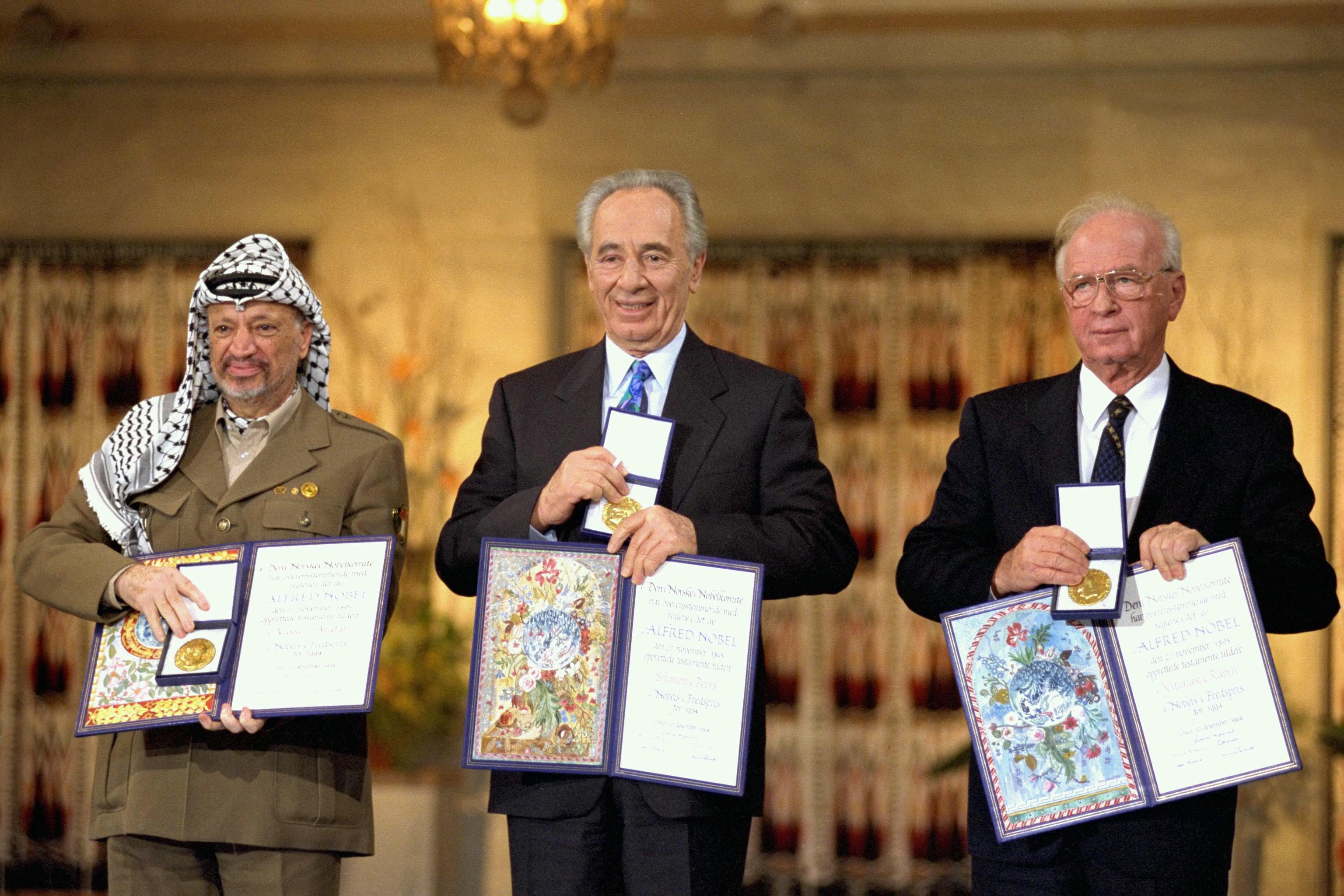
(right to left) Yitzhak Rabin, Shimon Peres and Yasser Arafat receiving the Nobel Peace Prize following the Oslo Accords

There are several Israeli views of the peace process. Israel's position is that the president of the Palestinian Authority, Mahmoud Abbas, ought to be the negotiating partner in the peace talks, and not Hamas, which has at times engaged with Israel in escalations of the conflict and attacks Israel's civilian population.

The violence of the second intifada and the political success of Hamas had convinced many Israelis that peace and negotiation are not possible and that a two-state system is not the answer. Since the break down of negotiations, security has played a less important role in Israeli concerns, trailing behind employment, corruption, housing and other pressing issues. Israeli policy had reoriented to focus on managing the conflict and the associated occupation of Palestinian territory, rather than reaching a negotiated solution. Hardliners believe that Israel should annex all Palestinian territory, or at least all minus the Gaza Strip. Israelis view the peace process as hindered and near impossible due to terrorism on the part of Palestinians and do not trust Palestinian leadership to maintain control. According to Slater, during the time when Yitzhak Rabin was in office, the Palestinian Authority largely fulfilled its commitment to combat terrorism. Palestinian security forces, led by Yasser Arafat, collaborated closely with Israeli security forces. This cooperation included joint patrols and efforts to identify and detain extremists and suspected terrorists, often based on lists provided by the Israelis. Pedahzur describes suicide terrorism as influencing the Israeli public's view of the value of maintaining forces on the ground in the occupied Gaza Strip. A common theme throughout the peace process has been a feeling that the Palestinians give too little in their peace offers.

Some Israelis believe that the Gaza Strip is fully controlled by the Hamas who do not want peace with Israel. According to the Israeli view, this limits the ability of the Palestinians to make peace with Israel and enforce it over the long term. Furthermore, in the Israeli view, a violent overtake of the West Bank by the Hamas as a result of the creation of an unstable new state is likely. Lastly, rhetoric from high-ranking Fatah officials promising a full, literal Palestinian right of return into Israel (a position no Israeli government can accept without destroying the Jewish character of Israel) makes peace negotiations more difficult.

=== US views on the peace process ===
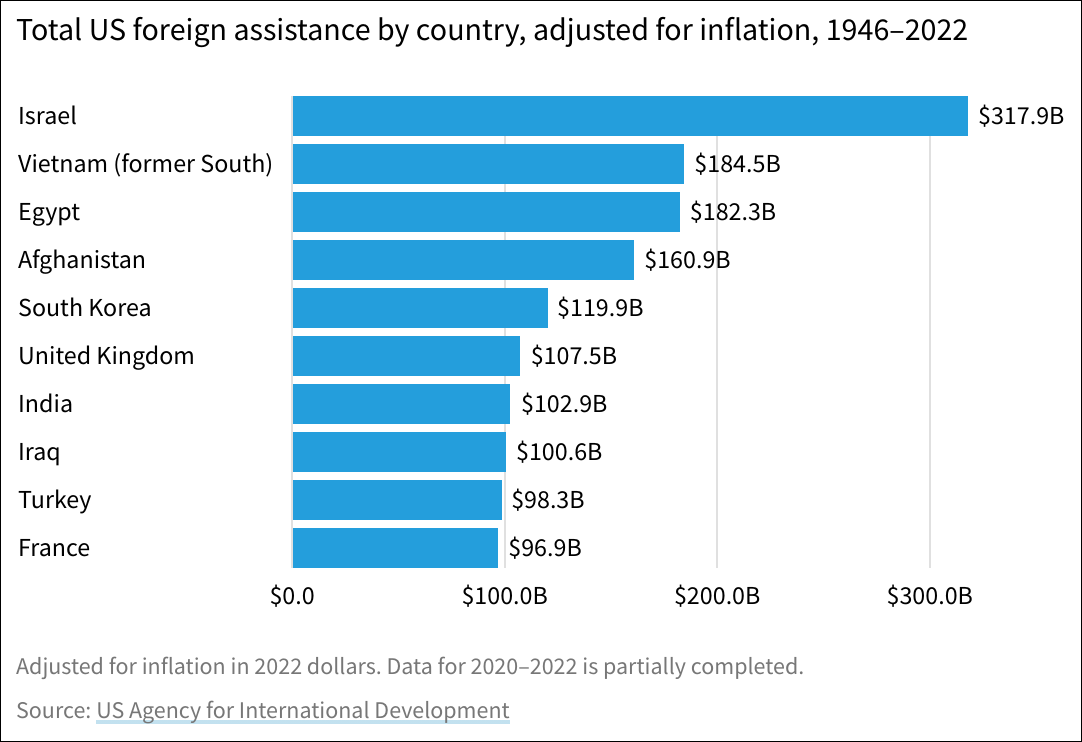
Total US foreign aid to Israel compared to other countries. 1946–2022.

US officials, citizens and lobbying groups hold divergent views on the peace process. All recent US Presidents have maintained a policy that Israel must give up some of the land that it conquered in the 1967 War in order to achieve peace; that the Palestinians must actively prevent terrorism; and that Israel has an unconditional right to exist. Presidents Bill Clinton and George W. Bush publicly supported the creation of a new Palestinian state out of most of the current Palestinian territories, based on the idea of self-determination for the Palestinian people, and President Obama continued that policy. Secretary of State Hillary Clinton thought that peace can only be achieved through direct, bilateral negotiations between Israel and the Palestinians. Obama outlined the pursuit of the two-state solution as American policy for achieving Palestinian aspirations, Israeli security, and a measure of stability in the Middle East.

According to the sociologist Mervin Verbit, American Jews are "more right than left" on peace process issues. Verbit found that surveys of American Jews often reflect the view of the poll's sponsors. Often it is the wording of the survey questions that bias the outcome (a headline illustrating this point reads "ADL poll shows higher support for Israel than did survey by dovish J Street"). Using survey data from the American Jewish Committee where findings could not be attributed to wording biases, Verbit found American Jews took a rightward shift following the collapse of the Camp David talks in 2000, and the 9/11 attacks in 2001.

The Jordanian-American journalist Rami George Khouri opines that United States is not willing to mediate a just Israeli-Palestinian peace; instead, to protect Israel, it sends military equipment to the country, which prevents any attempt to address the root causes of tension in the region. This has generated popular resistance groups across the Middle East that routinely attack both US and Israeli targets.

== Major issues between the two sides: 2000–2019 ==
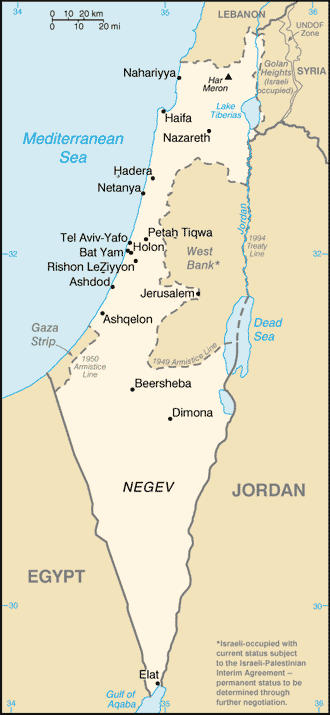
The 1949 Green Line borders

The core issues of the conflict are borders, the status of settlements in the West Bank, the status of east Jerusalem, the Palestinian refugee right of return, and security. With the PLO's recognition of Israel's right to exist in 1982, the international community with the main exception of the United States and Israel has been in consensus on a framework for resolving the conflict on the basis of international law. Various UN bodies and the ICJ have supported this position; every year, the UN General Assembly votes almost unanimously in favor of a resolution titled "Peaceful Settlement of the Question of Palestine". This resolution consistently affirms the illegality of the Israeli settlements, the annexation of East Jerusalem, and the principle of the inadmissibility of the acquisition of territory by war. It also emphasizes the need for an Israeli withdrawal from the Palestinian territory occupied since 1967 and the need for a just resolution to the refugee question on the basis of UN resolution 194.

There remain some activists on the Palestinian side who claim that there are still some positive signs on the Palestinian side, and that Israel should use these to cultivate some positive interactions with the Palestinians, even in spite of Hamas's basic opposition to the existence of the Jewish State. Since mid-June 2007, Israel has cooperated with Palestinian security forces in the West Bank at unprecedented levels, thanks in part to United States-sponsored training, equipping, and funding of the Palestinian National Security Forces and Presidential Guard.

A further concern is whether, as a result of this security argument, Israel will in fact allow the Palestinian community to emerge as a viable and sovereign political unit, a viable and contiguous state. There are also various economic and political restrictions placed on Palestinian people, activities, and institutions which have had a detrimental effect on the Palestinian economy and quality of life. Israel has said repeatedly that these restrictions are necessary due to security concerns, and in order to counteract ongoing efforts which promote terrorism which incite opposition to Israel's existence and rights as a country. The key obstacle therefore remains the Israeli demand for security versus Palestinian claims for rights and statehood.

Furthermore, the identification of 'Palestinian' with 'terrorist' can be construed as problematic, and Sayigh argues that this association is used as a rationale for maintaining the status quo, and that only by recognising the status of Jewish immigrants as 'settlers' can we conceptually move forwards.

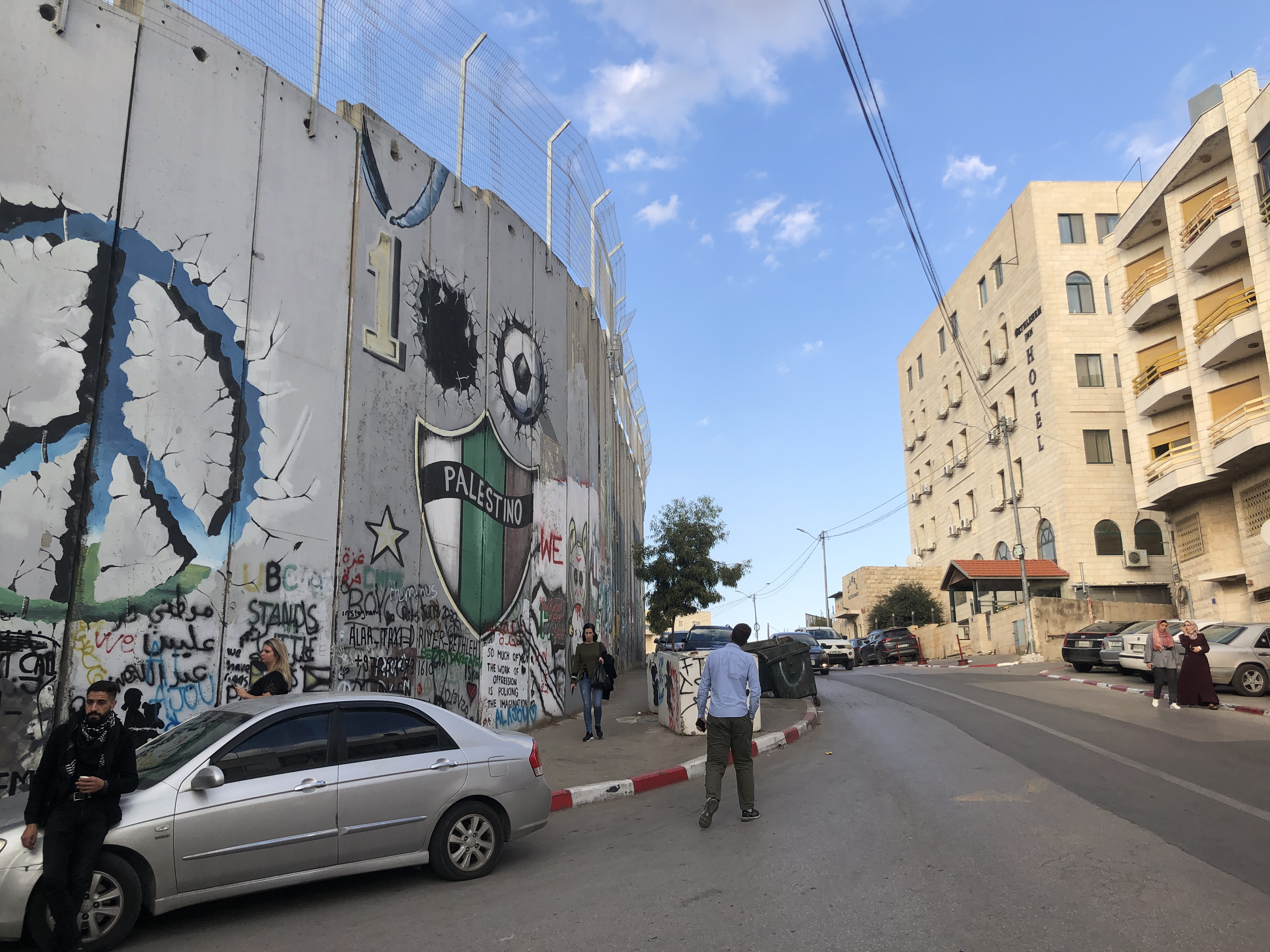
Israeli West Bank barrier in Bethlehem

Nevertheless, there is a range of ulterior motives for Israel's denial of Palestinian statehood. If Palestine were declared a state, then immediately, Israel, by its present occupation of the West Bank, will be in breach of the United Nations Charter. Palestine, as a state, could legitimately call upon the inherent right of individual or collective self-defense under Article 51 of the Charter to remove Israel from the occupied territories. Palestine, as a state, would be able to accede to international conventions and bring legal action against Israel on various matters. Palestine could accede to various international human rights instruments, such as the Covenant on Civil and Political Rights. It could even join the International Criminal Court and file cases against Israel for war crimes. It would be a tinderbox of a situation that is highly likely to precipitate conflict in the Middle East.

There is a lively debate around the shape that a lasting peace settlement would take (see for example the One-state solution and Two-state solution). Authors like Cook have argued that the one-state solution is opposed by Israel because the very nature of Zionism and Jewish nationalism calls for a Jewish majority state, whilst the two-state solution would require the difficult relocation of half a million Jewish settlers living in the West Bank and East Jerusalem. The Palestinian leaders such as Salam Fayyad have rejected calls for a binational state or unilateral declaration of statehood. As of 2010, only a minority of Palestinians and Israelis support the one-state solution. Interest in a one-state solution is growing as of 2012, however, as the two-state approach fails to accomplish a final agreement.

== Alternative peace processes ==
After Bill Clinton failed to broker an agreement at Camp David in 2000, two teams, one led by former Israeli Justice Minister Yossi Beilin and the other by former Palestinian Information Minister Yasser Abed Rabbo, started negotiations where the January 2001 meeting in Taba left off. Three years later, the two parties released an unofficial plan for peace, called the Geneva Accord (see the Geneva Initiative). It is a comprehensive and detailed two-state solution aiming at all the issues at stake, in particular, Jerusalem, the settlements, security, and the refugee problem. It was met with bitter denunciation by the Israeli government and many Palestinians, with the Palestinian Authority staying non-committal, but it was warmly welcomed by many European governments and some significant elements of the Bush Administration, including Secretary of State Colin Powell. In September 2009, a more detailed, expanded version of the plan was released. This is essentially a non-governmental version of the "shelf agreement" suggested by Condoleezza Rice and Tzipi Livni.

In 2022, Yossi Beilin, a founder of the Geneva Initiative, and other Israeli and Palestinian interlocutors proposed "The Holy Land Confederation" as a means of facilitating the two-state solution envisioned by the Geneva Initiative. "The Holy Land Confederation" would modify the Geneva Accord by giving settlers currently living in the future Palestinian state the option of permanent residency in Palestine, with an equal number of Palestinian refugees being allowed to reside in Israel.

A Land for All (also known as "Two States, One Homeland"), an Israeli-Palestinian political initiative, proposes a confederation of two sovereign, democratic states, modeled on the European Union. Borders along the 1967 Green Line would be open, with some controls, and residency of Palestinians in Israel and Israelis in Palestine would be allowed to gradually increase, by mutual agreement. Their proposal was presented to the UN at the July 2025 Conference on the Implementation of the Two-State Solution. In November, 2025, their proposal was adopted by Standing Together, a social justice movement of Jewish and Palestinian citizens of Israel.

== Joint economic effort and development ==
Despite the long history of conflict between Israelis and Palestinians, a number of peace initiatives that respect the rights of both peoples have been undertaken by people on both sides.

In March 2007, Japan proposed a plan for peace based on common economic development and effort, rather than on continuous wrangling over land. Both sides stated their support. This became the Peace Valley plan, a joint effort of the Israeli, Palestinian and Jordanian governments to promote economic cooperation, and new business initiatives which can help both sides work together, and create a better diplomatic atmosphere and better economic conditions. It is mainly designed to foster efforts in the private sector, once governments provide the initial investment and facilities.

== See also ==
- Peace discourse in the Israeli–Palestinian conflict
- Israel–Palestine relations
- Cold peace
- Israeli transfer of Palestinian militant bodies (2012)
- The Land of the Settlers
- Peace Now
- OneVoice Movement
- Women Wage Peace Movement
- Tolerance Monument
- Arab League and the Arab–Israeli conflict
- Americans for Peace Now
- Seeds of Peace
- The Case for Peace (book)
- PeaceMaker
- Arab–Israeli peace projects
- List of Middle East peace proposals
- The Environmental Provisions of Oslo II Accords
- Israeli–Palestinian economic peace efforts
- History of the State of Palestine
- Paris Peace Conference (1919–1920)
- Faisal–Weizmann Agreement (1919)
- Peel Commission
- International law and the Arab–Israeli conflict
- Western Sahara peace process

== Sources ==
- Baconi, Tareq (2018). Hamas Contained. Stanford University Press. ISBN 978-1-5036-0581-7.
- Khalidi, Rashid (2020). The Hundred Years' War on Palestine: A History of Settler Colonialism and Resistance, 1917–2017. Henry Holt and Company. ISBN 978-1-62779-854-9.
- Pappé, Ilan (2022). A History of Modern Palestine. Cambridge University Press. ISBN 978-1-108-24416-9.
- Shlaim, Avi (2015). The Iron Wall: Israel and the Arab World. Penguin Books. ISBN 978-0-14-103322-8.
- Farah, Randa (31 October 2013). Niklaus Steiner; Mark Gibney; Gil Loescher (eds.). Problems of Protection: The UNHCR, Refugees, and Human Rights. Routledge. pp. 160–. ISBN 978-1-135-39548-3.
