= Arab League and the Arab–Israeli conflict =

The Arab League was formed in Cairo on 22 March 1945 with six members: Egypt, Iraq, Transjordan (renamed Jordan after independence in 1946), Lebanon, Saudi Arabia, and Syria. Yemen joined on 5 May 1945. Since its formation the Arab League has promoted the Palestinian Arab cause in the Israeli–Palestinian conflict, including by imposing the Arab League boycott of Israel. The Arab League opposed the United Nations Partition Plan for Palestine in 1947. On 15 May 1948, the then seven Arab League members coordinated an invasion of what was by then the former British Mandate, marking the start of the 1948 Arab–Israeli War.

In 1964, the Arab League created the Palestine Liberation Organization to operate within the territory of Israel. During the Six-Day War, the Arab League was instrumental in the oil embargo, which lasted until the Khartoum Resolution in September 1967. The League members also agreed to continue the state of belligerency with Israel and not to negotiate a settlement to the conflict. The signing of the Egypt–Israel peace treaty was condemned, and Egypt was suspended from the Arab League in 1979, which lasted until 1989. The Arab League on 15 November 1988 recognized the proclamation of the State of Palestine. The Palestine Liberation Organization and Israel signed the Oslo Accords in 1993 which led to the setting up of the Palestinian National Authority. The Arab League has not made any official statements either supporting the establishment of the Palestinian Authority or condemning it. In October 1994, Jordan signed the Israel–Jordan peace treaty with Israel, and it was not ostracized by the Arab League, as Egypt had been in 1979. In 2002, the Arab League endorsed a Saudi Arabian Arab Peace Initiative which called for full withdrawal by Israel "to the 1967 borders" in return for fully normalized relations.

28-30 July 2025, the twenty-two nations of the Arab League, the European Union’s twenty-seven, and seventeen more, including Great Britain, “Indonesia for Asia”, “Senegal for Africa”, and “Brazil, Canada and Mexico for the Americas”, signed onto a document called the “New York Declaration,” on implementation of the two-state solution, at an international conference hosted by France and the Kingdom of Saudi Arabia, authorized by a resolution of the United Nations General Assembly adopted in December 2024 with a vote of 157 to 7. The conference aimed to develop a widely supported international framework addressing the disarmament of Hamas, the release of hostages in Gaza, the reform of the Palestinian Authority, and post-conflict planning, including consideration of a two-state solution in the form of a declaration envisioning a 15-month plan to establish a sovereign Palestine.

Key provisions: Israel to ceasefire and withdraw from Gaza and from depredations in the West Bank; Hamas to disarm, return all remaining hostages, and relinquish rule over Gaza. The Palestinian Authority/PLO was represented. Neither the US nor Israel were present, nor any representative of Hamas.[3][4][5][6][7][8][9][10]

== 1945–48 ==
At the end of World War II in 1945, the Palestinian Arabs were leaderless. The Grand Mufti of Jerusalem, Haj Amin al-Husseini, had been in exile since 1937, and spent the war years in occupied Europe, actively collaborating with Nazi leadership. His relative Jamal al-Husayni was interned in Southern Rhodesia during the war. As the war ended, Amin al-Husayni escaped to Egypt, and moved to Lebanon in 1959; he died in Beirut on 4 July 1974.

In November 1945 the Arab League re-established the Arab Higher Committee as the supreme executive body of Palestinian Arabs in the territory of the British Mandate of Palestine. The committee was immediately recognised by the then six Arab League countries; the Mandate government recognised the new Committee two months later. However, the Committee fell apart due to infighting, and in June 1946 the Arab League imposed upon the Palestinians the Arab Higher Executive, renamed as "Arab Higher Committee" in 1947, with Amin al-Husayni (then living in Egypt) as its chairman and Jamal al-Husayni as vice-chairman.

On 2 December 1945 the Arab League Council formally declared a boycott of any Jewish-owned business operating in Mandatory Palestine: "Jewish products and manufactured [goods] in Palestine shall be [considered] undesirable in the Arab countries; to permit them to enter the Arab countries would lead to the realization of the Zionist political objectives.

== 1948–49 ==
According to an interview in an 11 October 1947 article of Akhbar al-Yom, the Arab League Secretary Azzam Pasha reportedly said: "I personally wish that the Jews do not drive us to this war, as this will be a war of extermination and a momentous massacre which will be spoken of like the Mongolian massacres and the Crusades". The second part of this sentence, without the caveat that he hoped to avoid war and incorrectly dated to 15 May 1948 (the day after the Israeli Declaration of Independence), became known as the Azzam Pasha quotation, after it was widely disseminated in English as anti-Arab propaganda.

The Arab League bitterly opposed any attempts to establish a Jewish state and worked strenuously to defeat any partition of Palestine. When the United Nations Partition Plan for Palestine was adopted in resolution 181(II) by the General Assembly on 29 November 1947, it was unanimously rejected by the Arab League and by all its members and by leaders of the Arab community, including the Palestinian Arab Higher Committee.

On Friday, 14 May 1948, a day before the British Mandate over Palestine expired (the next day being Shabbat), the Jewish People's Council gathered at the Tel Aviv Museum, and approved a proclamation declaring the establishment of a Jewish state in Eretz Israel, to be known as the State of Israel. The next day the seven Arab League members, Iraq, Syria, Lebanon, Transjordan, Egypt, Saudi Arabia and Yemen, coordinated a march with their forces into what the previous day had been the area of the British Mandate, marking the start of the 1948 Arab–Israeli War. In the introduction to the cablegram from the Secretary-General of the League of Arab States to the UN Secretary-General on 15 May 1948, the Arab League gave reasons for the intervention of the Arab States:

On the occasion of the intervention of Arab States in Palestine to restore law and order and to prevent disturbances prevailing in Palestine from spreading into their territories and to check further bloodshed.

Clause 10 of the Cablegram said:-

10. Now that the Mandate over Palestine has come to an end, leaving no legally constituted authority behind in order to administer law and order in the country and afford the necessary and adequate protection to life and property, the Arab States declare as follows:
(a) The right to set up a Government in Palestine pertains to its inhabitants under the principles of self-determination recognized by the Covenant of the League of Nations as well as the United Nations Charter.
(b) Peace and order have been completely upset in Palestine, and, in consequence of Jewish aggression, approximately over a quarter of a million of the Arab population have been compelled to leave their homes and emigrate to neighbouring Arab countries.
(c) The Mandatory has already announced that on the termination of the Mandate it will no longer be responsible for the maintenance of law and order in Palestine except in the camps and areas actually occupied by its forces, and only to the extent necessary for the security of those forces and their withdrawal.

The Cablegram also declared -

The Arab States recognize that the independence and sovereignty of Palestine which was so far subject to the British Mandate has now, with the termination of the Mandate, become established in fact, and maintain that the lawful inhabitants of Palestine are alone competent and entitled to set up an administration in Palestine for the discharge of all governmental functions without any external interference. As soon as that stage is reached the intervention of the Arab States, which is confined to the restoration of peace and establishment of law and order, shall be put an end to, and the sovereign State of Palestine will be competent in co-operation with the other States members of the Arab League, to take every step for the promotion of the welfare and security of its peoples and territory.

Six days after the invasion, Azzam told reporters:

"We are fighting for an Arab Palestine. Whatever the outcome the Arabs will stick to their offer of equal citizenship for Jews in Arab Palestine and let them be as Jewish as they like. In areas where they predominate they will have complete autonomy."

However, despite the rhetoric Arab leaders were disunited. The Egyptians knew of Abdullah's agreement with Meir and were determined to thwart Transjordan's territorial ambitions, "thus the Arab war plan changed in conception and essence from a united effort to conquer parts of the nascent Jewish state and perhaps destroy it, into a multilateral land grab focusing on the Arab areas of the country."

An Egyptian Ministerial order dated 1 June 1948 declared that all laws in force during the Mandate would continue to be in force in the Gaza Strip. On 8 July 1948, the Arab League decided to set up a temporary civil administration in Palestine, to be directly responsible to the Arab League. This plan was strongly opposed by King Abdullah I of Transjordan, and received only half-hearted support from the Arab Higher Committee. The new administration was never properly established. Another order issued on 8 August 1948 vested an Egyptian Administrator-General with the powers of the High Commissioner.

The Egyptian government, suspicious of King Abdullah's intentions and growing power in Palestine, put a proposal to the Arab League meeting that opened in Alexandria on 6 September 1948. The plan would turn the temporary civil administration, which had been agreed to in July, into an Arab government with a seat in Gaza for the whole of Palestine. The formal announcement of the Arab League's decision to form the All-Palestine Government was issued on 20 September. The All-Palestine Government was established in Gaza on 22 September 1948 and was recognised by all Arab League countries except Jordan; and on 30 September a rival First Palestinian Congress was convened in Amman and promptly denounced the Gaza "government".

"A key feature of the Arabs' plans was the complete marginalization of the Palestinians... This aptly reflected the political reality: The military defeats of April–May had rendered them insignificant. The Arab League through the first half of 1948 had consistently rejected Husseini's appeals to establish a government-in-exile... Under strong pressure from Egypt, which feared complete Hashemite control over the Palestinians, the League Political Committee in mid-September authorized the establishment of a Palestinian 'government.'"

== 1949–1967 ==
As a result of 1949 Armistice Agreements, the West Bank, including East Jerusalem were ruled by Jordan, while the Gaza Strip was occupied by Egypt until the 1967 Six-Day War. During the first few months of 1950, Israel and Jordan came very close to creating a separate "five-year non-aggression agreement". However, on 13 April 1950, Arab League members signed an agreement on Joint Defense and Economic Cooperation, which committed the signatories to coordination of military defense measures, and "the Arab League resolved to expel any Arab state which reached a separate economic, political or military agreement with Israel." Under pressure from the Arab League, the agreement between Israel and Jordan never came to pass. Jordan formally annexed the West Bank on 24 April 1950. King Abdallah was assassinated on 20 July 1951.

In 1959, without reference to the Arab League that had created it, Gamal Abdel Nasser officially dissolved the All-Palestine Government by decree, arguing that the All-Palestine Government had failed to successfully advance the Palestinian cause. The Gaza Strip became directly administered by Egypt. At that time, Amin al-Husayni moved from Egypt to Lebanon.

At the Cairo Summit of 1964, the Arab League initiated the creation of an organisation representing the Palestinian people. The first Palestinian National Council convened in East Jerusalem on 29 May 1964. The Palestine Liberation Organization was founded during this meeting on 2 June 1964. The area of activity for the PLO was clearly within the then borders of the State of Israel: the Palestinian National Charter of 1964 stated:

This Organization does not exercise any territorial sovereignty over the West Bank in the Hashemite Kingdom of Jordan, on the Gaza Strip or in the Himmah Area.

According to Yaacov Lozowick, "It was not the Palestinians themselves who decided to create the PLO after their defeat in 1948; the Arab League set it up in 1964 to attack Israel. For years, Palestinian independence was off the Arab agenda; now it was back. Inventing the PLO was a prelude to war, not a result of it; the goal was to destroy Israel, not to rectify the misfortune of the Palestinians, which still could have been done by the Arab states irrespective of Israel."

== 1967–2000 ==
On 1 September 1967, in the wake of the Six-Day War, eight leaders of Arab countries issued the Khartoum Resolution. Paragraph 3 of the resolution became known as the Three No's: "no peace with Israel, no recognition of Israel, no negotiations with it."

President Anwar Sadat's visit to Jerusalem, the 1978 Camp David Peace Accords between Egypt and Israel and the Egypt–Israel peace treaty were each condemned in the Arab World, and Egypt was suspended from the Arab League in 1979 after signing a peace treaty with Israel and the League's headquarters was moved from Cairo. Egypt was readmitted in 1989.

On 15 November 1988, the Palestinian National Council unilaterally proclaimed the establishment of the State of Palestine, which the Arab League immediately recognized. At the time, the PLO was based in Tunis and did not have control over any part of Palestine. On 13 September 1993, the Palestine Liberation Organization (PLO) and Israel signed the Oslo Accords which led to the setting up of the Palestinian National Authority. The Accords made no reference to the declaration of 1988 of Palestinian statehood, and marked the first political agreement between Palestinian Arab leaders and Israel. The Arab League has not made any official statements either supporting the establishment of the Palestinian Authority or condemning it. In October 1994, Jordan signed the Israel–Jordan peace treaty with Israel, and it was not ostracized by the Arab League, as Egypt had been in 1979.

== After 2000 ==
In 2002, Saudi Arabia proposed the Arab Peace Initiative in The New York Times, which was endorsed unanimously at a summit meeting of the Arab League in Beirut. The plan is based on UN Security Council Resolution 242 and Resolution 338, but makes more demands, essentially calling for full withdrawal by Israel "to the 1967 borders" (i.e., the 1949 Armistice line) in return for fully normalized relations with the whole Arab world.

In response, Israeli Foreign Minister Shimon Peres stated: "... the Saudi step is an important one, but it is liable to founder if terrorism is not stopped. ... It is ... clear that the details of every peace plan must be discussed directly between Israel and the Palestinians, and to make this possible, the Palestinian Authority must put an end to terror, the horrifying expression of which we witnessed just last night in Netanya", referring to the Netanya suicide attack.

The Arab League has since re-endorsed the Initiative on several occasions, including at the Riyadh Summit in March 2007. On 25 July 2007, the Jordanian foreign minister Abdul Ilah Khatib and Egyptian foreign minister Ahmed Aboul Gheit—appointed by the Arab League as its representatives—met with Israeli prime minister Ehud Olmert, foreign minister Tzipi Livni, and defense minister Ehud Barak in Jerusalem. This was the first time that an Israeli government received an official delegation from the Arab League.

As of 2021, only six of the twenty-two members of the Arab League have recognized Israel: Egypt, Jordan, United Arab Emirates, Bahrain, Sudan and Morocco. Relations with Israel have deteriorated, especially after the last Gaza War, where Mauritania had suspended its relations with Israel.

== July 2025 ==
See full article July 2025 Conference on the Implementation of the Two-State Solution

== See also ==
- Arab League boycott of Israel
- Palestinian refugees and Jewish refugees
- Suez Crisis
- 1970 Black September in Jordan and Civil War in Lebanon
- Yom Kippur War
- 1982 Lebanon War
- Gulf War
- 2003 invasion of Iraq
- 2006 Lebanon War

Arab–Israeli peace diplomacy and treaties

- Paris Peace Conference, 1919
- Faisal–Weizmann Agreement
- 1949 Armistice Agreements
- Camp David Accords
- Madrid Conference of 1991
- Israel–Jordan Treaty of Peace
- Oslo Accords
- 2000 Camp David Summit
- Israeli–Palestinian peace process
- Arab–Israeli peace projects
- List of Middle East peace proposals
- International law and the Arab–Israeli conflict
