= Valley of Peace initiative =

Project between Israel, Jordan and Palestine

The Valley of Peace initiative was an effort to promote economic cooperation between Israel, Jordan, and Palestine that saw slow progress and had a few successes the 2000s and 2010s. It was based around efforts and joint projects in the Arava/Arabah Valley, along which runs the southern portion of the Israel - Jordan border. It received the personal attention and support of Shimon Peres, President of Israel. The initiative involved ongoing joint efforts by regional leaders to launch joint new industrial and economic projects, which will create new local businesses and job growth, and promote ongoing cooperation.

One major component of this plan is the construction and operation of Qualifying Industrial Zones. These are industrial facilities within Jordan and Egypt which can serve as centers of collaborative effort.

Since the beginning of the Gaza war in October 2023, any such projects promoting cultural ties and fostering interdependence between Israel & Palestine have been put on hold indefinitely or rolled back.

== Overview and current status ==
The idea for this project began in 2005, when Israel, Jordan and the Palestinian Authority asked the World Bank to analyze the feasibility of this idea. Work on this project was stopped in 2021.

The formal proposal for the Valley of Peace initiative began with a joint proposal in 2008 to build a canal between the Red and Dead Seas, desalinating the water, producing hydroelectric power and yielding profits, clean water, jobs and potentially unprecedented regional cooperation. The study concluded in 2013, and an agreement was signed in 2013 by Israel, Jordan, and the Palestinian Authority to move ahead with the plan.

In February 2015, Israel and Jordan signed an agreement to exchange water and jointly convey Red Sea brine to the shrinking Dead Sea. The agreement was reported to be worth about $800 million. It was the result of a memorandum of understanding signed among Israeli, Jordanian and Palestinian officials on December 9, 2013, in Washington. Under this agreement, Jordan and Israel would have shared the potable water produced by a future desalination plant in Aqaba, while a pipeline would have supplied salt water to the Dead Sea.

In December 2015, Israel and Jordan formally released the technical plans to move ahead with this project.

A new desalination plant to be built near the Jordanian tourist resort of Aqaba would have converted salt water from the Red Sea into fresh water for use in southern Israel and southern Jordan; each region would get eight billion to 13 billion gallons a year. This process was projected to produce about as much brine as a waste product; the brine would be piped more than 100 miles to help replenish the Dead Sea, already known for its high salt content. The goal was reinforce the status of the Dead Sea as an important economic resource to both nations, in multiple areas including tourism, industry and business.

In July 2017, Israel and the Palestinian Authority announced a new deal to provide drinking water for millions of Palestinians. this was part of the larger deal between Israel, Jordan and Palestine to build a 220-kilometer (137-mile) pipeline to convey water from the Red Sea to the Dead Sea. One benefit of this canal would be to replenish the dwindling Dead Sea. Also, the water in this canal will generate electricity for local towns, and will also power a desalination plant to produce drinking water. Work on this project was stopped in 2021.

== Original plan and features, 2008 ==
The effort first got attention in 2008, when various regional leaders began to promote this set of ideas.

One major part of the plan includes the private sector development of a $3 billion, 166 km-long (103-mile) canal system along the Arava, known as the Two Seas Canal. This engineering scheme would bring Red Sea water to the Dead Sea and could provide additional projects and benefits to the region and increase cooperation between Israelis, Jordanians, and Palestinians, through greater development and economic integration. Some environmentalists have criticized the plan, saying that rehabilitation of the Jordan River would be a better way to save the Dead Sea, and would bring less disruption.

This Valley of Peace is part of a 20-kilometer [23-mile] corridor being proposed by Israeli President Shimon Peres for regional economic development. About 420 km of the corridor runs along the Jordanian border, with no border fences, and another 100 km touches on the Palestinian territories. Other projects involve the German, Japanese, and Turkish governments and are slated to create up to a million new jobs in Israel and the West Bank.

=== Original project contents, 2008 ===
As first proposed in 2008, the plan encompassed a number of items. Some possible future developments along the canal may include convention centers, hotels for up to 200,000 people, restaurants, parks, and artificial lakes and lagoons, and greenhouses for winter fruits and vegetables. A high-speed train line and highway would run along the canal allowing travel between the Dead and Red Seas within an hour. The area may also become a free-trade zone, thus attracting investment from around the world.

The canal might also include a major desalinization plant. In May 2008, it was announced that this project was getting close to being implemented.

PIEFZA is a Palestinian economic organization designed to promote participation in the industrial parks which will be created by this effort. The project will also include a number of other separate efforts and projects, including:

- An industrial area in Jenin to create jobs, with support from Germany, which pledged about $30 million to help with this. This would be used for businesses in the fields of textile, wood, and food products. A similar effort has already succeeded in the Jordanian industrial zone.
- An agro-industrial park to be built near Jericho, with support from Japan.
- The "Erez Industrial Estate" project - a free industrial zone near Erez crossing, with support from Turkey. It will be supported through a joint effort by Turkish, Israeli and Palestinian private sectors, known as the Ankara Forum which will also pursue other common economic goals and industrial projects. The project received the support of the Israeli, Turkish and Palestinian presidents during a trilateral summit in Ankara the previous November, according to an aide to Peres. The seventh meeting of the Ankara Forum for Economic Cooperation on November 13, 2007, brought together business representatives from the Union of Chambers and Commodity Exchanges of Turkey (TOBB), the Federation of Palestinian Chambers of Commerce, Industry and Agriculture and the Israeli Manufacturers' Association. Turkey has played a crucial role to bring peace to the region by playing facilitator role between the regional countries.
- A hi-tech industrial park in Nazareth by entrepreneur Stef Wertheimer, which was completed and opened on April 23, 2013. Wertheimer has stated, "Coexistence in the industrial park in Arab Nazareth is a good example of coexistence. When people work together, they have no time for nonsense. They're too tired at night to commit terrorist acts. They're satisfied, they engage in producing. They work together, not against each other." Wertheimer has founded four industrial parks in Israel. "The idea of industrial parks in the Middle East and on the borders between Israel and its neighbors is that the parks will bring industry and provide jobs, which will keep people busy working, instead of engaging in terrorism," explains Wertheimer. One park is the Tefen Industrial Park, which includes everything from transportation to cultural and educational facilities. In April 2013, a new industrial park opened in Nazareth. He has established seven industrial parks – in Tefen, Tel-Hai, Dalton, Lavon and now Nazareth in the Galilee; in Omer in the Negev; and another in Turkey.
- A car factory to be operated jointly by Israel and Jordan. It would manufacture cars made by Toyota and Renault.
- an airport in Eilat shared by Jordan and Israel, which will facilitate future cooperation in tourism between the two countries. It would include a Jordanian terminal, for tourists to Jordan, and an Israeli terminal, leading tourism to Eilat.
- A railway connection between Jordan and Israel, which would facilitate shipments of goods between the two countries.
- Agro-industrial development in Jericho, enabling the region to be a major agricultural source for the Middle East. Japan has offered to aid in the development of this.
- A joint Israeli-Palestinian university and medical center. This effort would be led by Ali Dogramaci, a Turkish professor, and will be located on the Israeli side of the Green Line, between Afula and Jenin. As of June 2009, the status of this project is in doubt due to some objections raised by some officials within the Israeli Government. However, the Turkish Government has given this effort some encouragement.

== Project history ==
=== Project origins, 2005–2008 ===
The idea for this project began in 2005, when Israel, Jordan and the Palestinian Authority asked the World Bank to analyze the feasibility of the idea.

In July 2006, Japan announced a plan for peace called "Corridor for Peace and Prosperity", which would be based on common economic development and effort, rather than on continuous contention over land. Shimon Peres gave this idea much attention during his participation in an international conference in New York in September 2006 which was organized by former U.S. President Bill Clinton.

In March 2007, at a two-day conference in Tokyo which included officials from Japan, Israel and the Palestinian Authority, Japan discussed its plan for peace based on common economic development and effort. Both sides stated their support.

In March 2007, the Israeli Cabinet officially decided to adopt the Peace Valley plan, which would entail promotion of and cooperation on economic development for Palestinians. However, some news reports indicated there was little chance of movement due to lack of attention by Prime Minister Ehud Olmert and the government of Israel.

In his inaugural speech in July 2007, Peres mentioned this effort, and asserted that there was great potential for cooperation among Israel, Palestinians, and Jordan. He also noted this might mean positive support from Persian Gulf states. In August 2007, Peres met with several Israeli businessmen to discuss ways to press the plan forward. Peres stated that the plan might have many positive effects which might help promote peace.

In August 2007, Foreign Ministers of Israel, Jordan, the Palestinian Authority, and Japan met in Jericho, and formally agreed to go ahead with this plan. A ceremony took place that month in Jericho formally launching the project. it was attended by Israeli Foreign Minister Tzipi Livni, Palestinian negotiator Saeb Erekat, Japanese Foreign Minister Taro Aso and Jordanian Foreign Minister Abdul-Ilah Khatib.

In January 2008, Peres announced that the plan had moved closer to realization, as new details were announced for implementation of joint economic effort in four locations in the West Bank. This included specific plans for industrial projects, and a jointly-built university, and investments from several countries, including Japan, Turkey and Germany. Peres discussed this with Tony Blair during Blair's visit to the Mideast in February 2008. Peres said that efforts were moving ahead.

USAID and the World Bank have reviewed many of the specific proposals in depth, and issued a critique of many strengths and weaknesses of the plan. In May 2008 Tony Blair announced a new plan for peace and for Palestinian rights, based heavily on the ideas on the Peace Valley plan.

In May 2008, Peres hosted a conference in celebration of Israel's 60th anniversary, called "Facing Tomorrow". He addressed numerous issues related to Israel's future. He discussed the Peace Valley initiative with numerous foreign leaders. President George Bush expressed support for the idea. Peres said that the initiative could bring lasting peace and transformation to the region. Regarding Palestinians, he said,

"They haven't established a proper government and they don't have an army. We can't unite them and we can't divide them. We can't help them politically. We can only help them economically. Today, it's possible to coordinate economic aid with both the Jordanians and the Palestinians."

== Public statements ==
Benjamin Netanyahu, a former Finance Minister of Israel and the former Prime Minister of Israel has repeatedly made public statements during the 2009 Israeli elections which advocated an approach to peace based on economic cooperation and joint effort, rather than continuous contention over political and diplomatic issues. He raised these ideas during discussions with U.S. Secretary of State Condoleezza Rice. Netanyahu continued to advocate these ideas as the Israeli elections got nearer and plans to execute them after he assumed office.

Netanyahu has said:

Right now, the peace talks are based only one thing, only on peace talks. It makes no sense at this point to talk about the most contractible issue. It's Jerusalem or bust, or right of return or bust. That has led to failure and is likely to lead to failure again....We must weave an economic peace alongside a political process. That means that we have to strengthen the moderate parts of the Palestinian economy by handing rapid growth in those area, rapid economic growth that gives a stake for peace for the ordinary Palestinians."

Similarly, in a Jerusalem Post interview, Tony Blair, the special envoy for the Quartet, said in May 2009:

Question: ...we're hearing about a determination to build from the bottom up with the Palestinians, including assurances that economic projects that had been stymied will now be advanced...

Blair: ...you have to build from the bottom up as well as negotiate from the top down...because once you take the three "headings" - politics, economics and security... Each of these things take decisions...it will become apparent, whether Israelis are prepared to build from the bottom up, and whether Palestinians understand that Israel will only tolerate a Palestinian state that is a stable and secure neighbor...

...people ask me, why are you bothered about whether there's a bit of agri-industrial thing around Jericho. And I say, because it matters. The detail on the ground really matters. Just supposing you've [created the conditions] in the Jericho area to exploit the [tourism] potential it has got. You're creating a whole set of stake-holders who, when it comes to those difficult concessions, are going to say, "We want the state." They are then believing in a reality, not a shibboleth...

== Implementation and effects ==
The Bethlehem Small Enterprise Center opened in early 2008 with funding from Germany, and has helped Palestinian small businesses in various areas, such as helping printers to improve software and olive wood craftsmen to market their products.

In 2008, the economy in the West Bank improved gradually. Economic growth for the occupied areas reached about 4-5% and unemployment dropped about 3%. Israeli figures indicated that wages in the West Bank rose more than 20% in 2008 and trade rose about 35%. Tourism in Bethlehem increased to about twice its previous levels, and tourism increased by 50% in Jericho. In 2009, an economic boom began with growth reaching 7 percent, higher than in Israel or the West. Tourism to Bethlehem, which had doubled to 1 million in 2008, rose to nearly 1.5 million in 2009. New car imports increased by 44 percent. New shopping malls opened in Jenin and Nablus. Palestinian developers are planning to build the first modern Palestinian city, Rawabi.

In 2009, efforts continued to build Palestinian local institutions and governments from the ground up. Much of this work was done by Tony Blair and U.S. General Keith Dayton. Some analysts saw this as a more substantial way to lay a groundwork for viable institutions and for local peace.

== See also ==
- Israeli–Palestinian conflict
- Projects working for peace among Arabs and Israelis
- Middle East economic integration
- Red Sea–Dead Sea Canal
- Israeli–Palestinian economic peace efforts

Specific groups

- Trade Unions Linking Israel and Palestine
- Arava Institute for Environmental Studies
- Alliance for Middle East Peace
