= Munich Group =

Israel Palestine peace quartet

Munich Group or the Munich Format refers to the foreign ministers of Egypt, Jordan, France, and Germany in February 2020, meeting on the sidelines of the Munich Security Conference, to discuss Israel-Palestine peace efforts.

Subsequent meetings took place in July via videoconference, September in Jordan and January 2021 in Cairo, in Paris in March 2021, and in Munich on February 19, 2022.

On 22 September 2022, the group met with Josep Borrell, High Representative of the European Union for Foreign Affairs and Security Policy, and the United Nations Special Coordinator for the Middle East Peace Process, Tor Wennesland, and in a statement said "with a view to advancing the Middle East Peace Process towards a just, comprehensive and lasting peace on the basis of the two-state solution"
