= Keith Dayton =

American army general (born 1949)

Keith W. Dayton
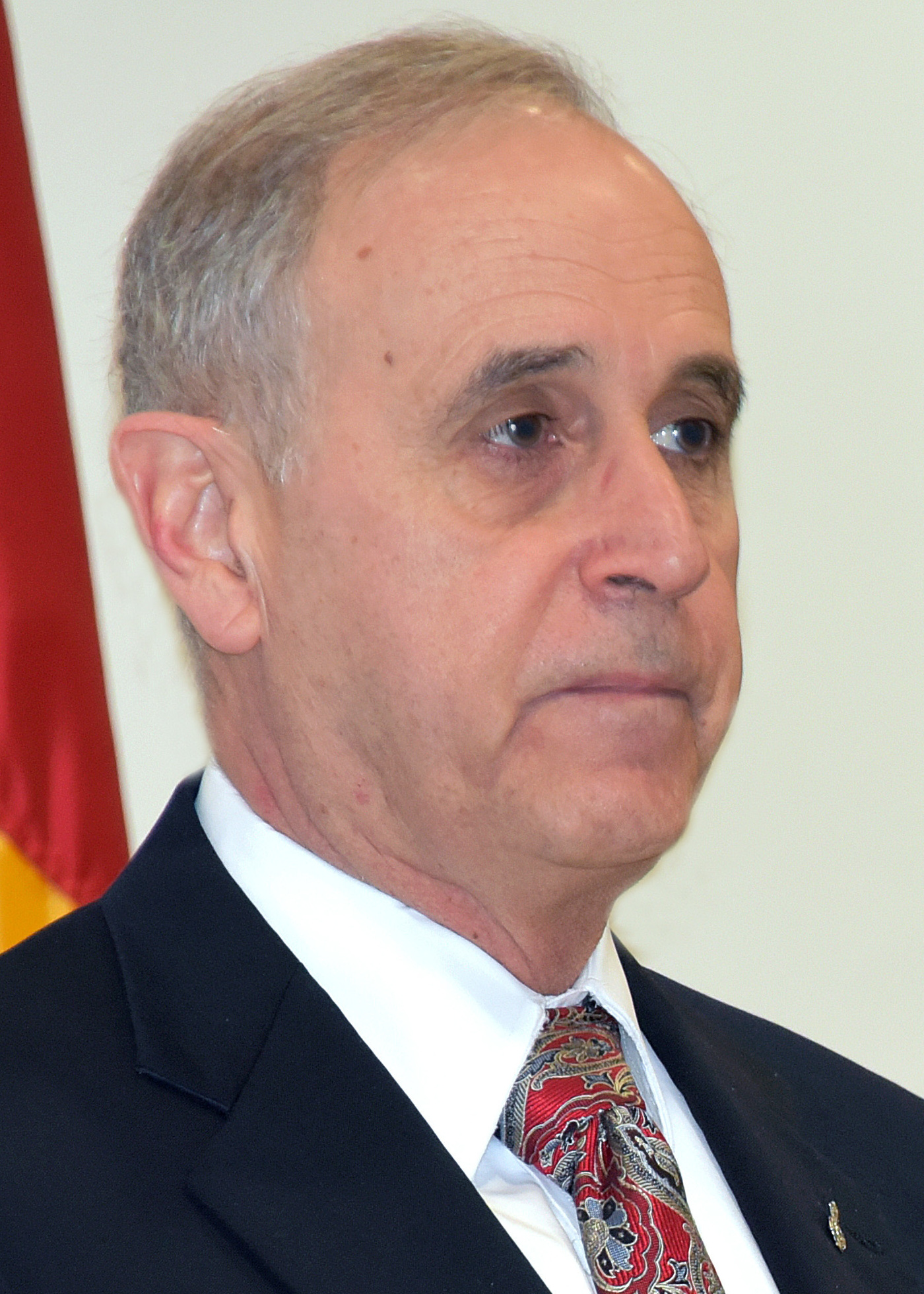
- Born: March 7, 1949 (age 77)
- Military career
- Allegiance: United States of America
- Branch: United States Army
- Service years: 1970–2010
- Rank: Lieutenant General
- Commands: HHB, 1st Battalion, 84th Field Artillery, 9th Infantry Division; C Battery, 1st Battalion, 84th Field Artillery, 9th Infantry Division; 4th Battalion, 29th Field Artillery, 8th Infantry Division; Division Artillery, 3rd Infantry Division; Deputy Director, Human Intelligence, Defense Intelligence Agency; Director, Iraq Survey Group
- Conflicts: Operation Iraqi Freedom
- Awards: Defense Distinguished Service Medal; Distinguished Service Medal; Defense Superior Service Medal; Legion of Merit

Keith W. Dayton (born March 7, 1949) is a retired lieutenant general in the United States Army who currently serves as the director of the George C. Marshall European Center for Security Studies in Garmisch-Partenkirchen, Germany. Dayton served as the U.S. security coordinator for Israel-Palestinian Authority in Tel Aviv, Israel from December 2005 to October 2010. He has also served as the director of the Iraq Survey Group, as a senior member of the Joint Staff, and as U.S. defense attaché in the U.S. Embassy in Moscow, Russia.

== Career ==
After graduating from the College of William & Mary in 1970, Dayton was immediately commissioned as an artillery officer through the Reserve Officer Training Corps. He received Russian language training at the Defense Language Institute and trained as a foreign area officer (FAO) with an emphasis on the former Soviet Union. Prior to his current assignment, he spent 37 years in a variety of command and staff assignments, most recently serving as the director of the Iraq Survey Group (responsible for finding evidence of alleged WMD) during Operation Iraqi Freedom and as Director of Strategy, Plans and Policy, Office of the Deputy Chief of Staff, G-3, United States Army, before his assignment as U.S. Security Coordinator for Israel and the Palestinian Authority.

Other key assignments include deputy director for Politico-Military Affairs, Joint Staff; United States Defense Attaché, Moscow, Russia; senior Army fellow on the Council on Foreign Relations, New York; commander, Division Artillery, 3rd Infantry Division (Mechanized), Germany; and commander, 4th Battalion, 29th Field Artillery; 8th Infantry Division (Mechanized), Germany.

He has written many technical articles over the course of his career, as well as was one of the co-authors of The Future of NATO: Facing an Unreliable Enemy in an Uncertain Environment, a study on the future of NATO published in 1991.

Lt. Gen. Dayton served five years as the United States Security Coordinator (USSC) for Israel and the Palestinian Authority. His leadership of the USSC team included overseeing the training of Palestinian Authority forces. Lt. General Dayton was widely lauded for his "rebuilding" of the Palestinian National Security Service, with thousands of members training in neighboring Jordan. He left Israel in October 2010 and retired from the military in December 2010. In 2018, Defense Secretary James Mattis appointed Dayton to serve as the senior U.S. defense advisor to Ukraine.

In December 2019, Politico reported that the administration of U.S. President Donald Trump was considering Dayton to be the nominee for U.S. Ambassador to Ukraine. On May 1, 2020, President Trump announced his intent to nominate Dayton to the position. On May 14, 2020, his nomination was sent to the United States Senate. On January 3, 2021, his nomination was returned to the President under Rule XXXI, Paragraph 6 of the United States Senate.

In May 2021, Dayton retired as director of the George C. Marshall European Center for Security Studies. He was awarded the Department of Defense Medal for Distinguished Civilian Service on May 3, 2023.

== Dates of rank ==
- Second Lieutenant (June 3, 1970)
- First Lieutenant (June 3, 1971)
- Captain (June 3, 1974)
- Major (May 6, 1981)
- Lieutenant Colonel (September 1, 1987)
- Colonel (June 1, 1992)
- Brigadier General (June 1, 1998)
- Major General (October 1, 2001)
- Lieutenant General (December 10, 2005)

== Medals and decorations ==
- Defense Distinguished Service Medal with 2 Oak Leaf Clusters
- Army Distinguished Service Medal
- Defense Superior Service Medal
- Legion of Merit with 1 Oak Leaf Cluster
- Meritorious Service Medal
- Army Commendation Medal
- Basic Parachutist Badge
- Ranger Tab
- Joint Chiefs of Staff Identification Badge
- Army Staff Identification Badge
- Department of Defense Distinguished Civilian Service Award

== Formal education ==
- College of William & Mary – B.S. - History (1970)
- Cambridge University – M.A. - History
- University of Southern California – M.A. - International Relations

== Military education ==
- Field Artillery Officer Basic Course – Ft. Sill, Oklahoma
- Infantry Officer Advanced Course – Ft. Benning, Georgia (June 1977 – December 1977)
- U.S. Army Command & General Staff College – Ft. Leavenworth, Kansas (August 1981 – June 1982)
- Senior Service College Fellowship – Harvard University – Cambridge, Massachusetts (August 1989 – June 1990)
- Foreign area officer Course – Ft. Bragg, North Carolina (January 1978 – June 1978)
- Basic Russian Language Course – Defense Language Institute, Presidio of Monterey, California (June 1978 – June 1979)
- Soviet Union Foreign Area Officer Overseas Training Program – U.S. Army Russian Institute, Germany (June 1979 – July 1981)

== See also ==
- Peace Valley plan
