= Noa Rothman =

Israeli lawyer, screenwriter and political activist

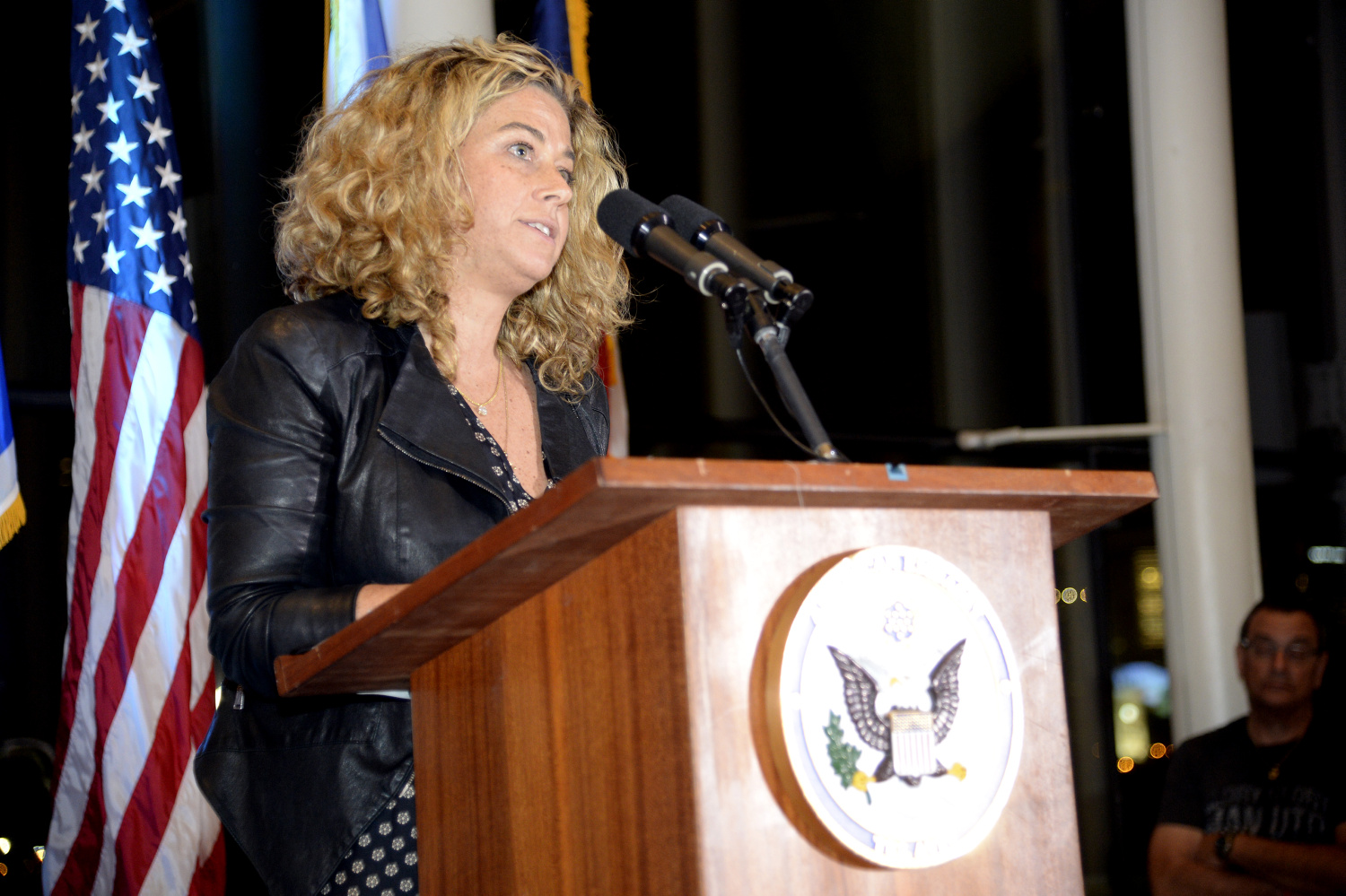
Rothman in 2017

Noa Rothman (Hebrew: נֹעה רוטמן), also known as Noa Ben Artzi-Pelossof ( Hebrew נעה בן־ארצי־פילוסוף, born March 20, 1977 ), is an Israeli lawyer, screenwriter and political activist. She is the granddaughter of Israeli Prime Minister Yitzhak Rabin, and at age 18, she was the only family member to publicly eulogize him at his funeral following his assassination. In 2019, she was on the Democratic Union list in the elections to the 22nd Knesset. She is married to Eldad Rothman.

== Awards and honors ==
- 1997: Prize “The Political Book 1997” from the working group of publishers, booksellers and librarians in the Friedrich Ebert Foundation
