= Abdul Ilah Khatib =

Jordanian politician

Abdul Ilah Al Khatib
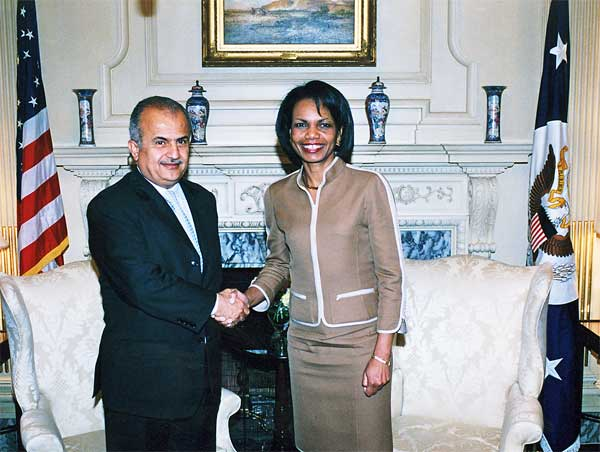
- Abdelilah Al Khatib and Condoleezza Rice, May 11, 2006

Minister of Foreign Affairs of Jordan
- In office 27 November 2005 – 22 November 2007

Minister of Foreign Affairs of Jordan
- In office 21 August 1998 – 14 January 2001

Minister of Tourism of Jordan
- In office 8 January 1995 – 4 February 1996

Personal details
- Born: March 31, 1953 (age 73) Salt, Jordan
- Education: Johns Hopkins University, American University

Abdul Ilah Mohammad Khatib or Abdelilah al-Khatib (/ˈɑːbdəl ˈɪlə æl kəˈtiːb/ AHB-dəl IL-ə al kə-TEEB; Arabic: عبد الإله الخطيب) (born 31 March 1953) is a former Minister of Foreign Affairs for Jordan. On March 11, 2011 he was appointed as the UN Special envoy to Libya.

== Early life ==
Married, and the father of three children, Khatib graduated with his Master's degree in International economics from Johns Hopkins School of Advanced International Studies, a master's degree in International Communications from the American University in Washington, D.C., and a bachelor's degree in political science from the School of Political Science in Athens, Greece.

== Career ==
- He was appointed UN Special Envoy to Libya on 7 March 2011
- Minister of Foreign Affairs in Marouf al-Bakhit's government (November 2005 - November 2007)
- Minister of Foreign Affairs in Ali Abu al-Ragheb's government (June 2000 - January 2002)
- Minister of Foreign Affairs in Abdelraouf al-Rawabdeh's government (August 1998 - June 2000)
- Minister of Foreign Affairs in Fayez al-Tarawneh's government (March 1999 - March 1999)
- Managing Director of Jordan Cement Factories Company (1996 - 1998)
- Minister of Tourism and Antiquities in Zaid ibn Shaker's government (January 1995 - February 1996)
- General manager of Dammam Investment Company (1994 - 1995))
- Member of board of directors in several investment, industrial and financial corporations. (1993-1994)
- An overseer of Jordan's contributions to the Arab-Israeli peace talks (1992-1993)
- Head of Private Office in Ministry of Foreign affairs in Jordan (1988 - 1993)
- Diplomat in the Embassy of Jordan (Washington) (1984 - 1988)
- Member of board of trustees of the American Center of Oriental Research
