= Outline of Jordan =

Country in the Levant region in West Asia

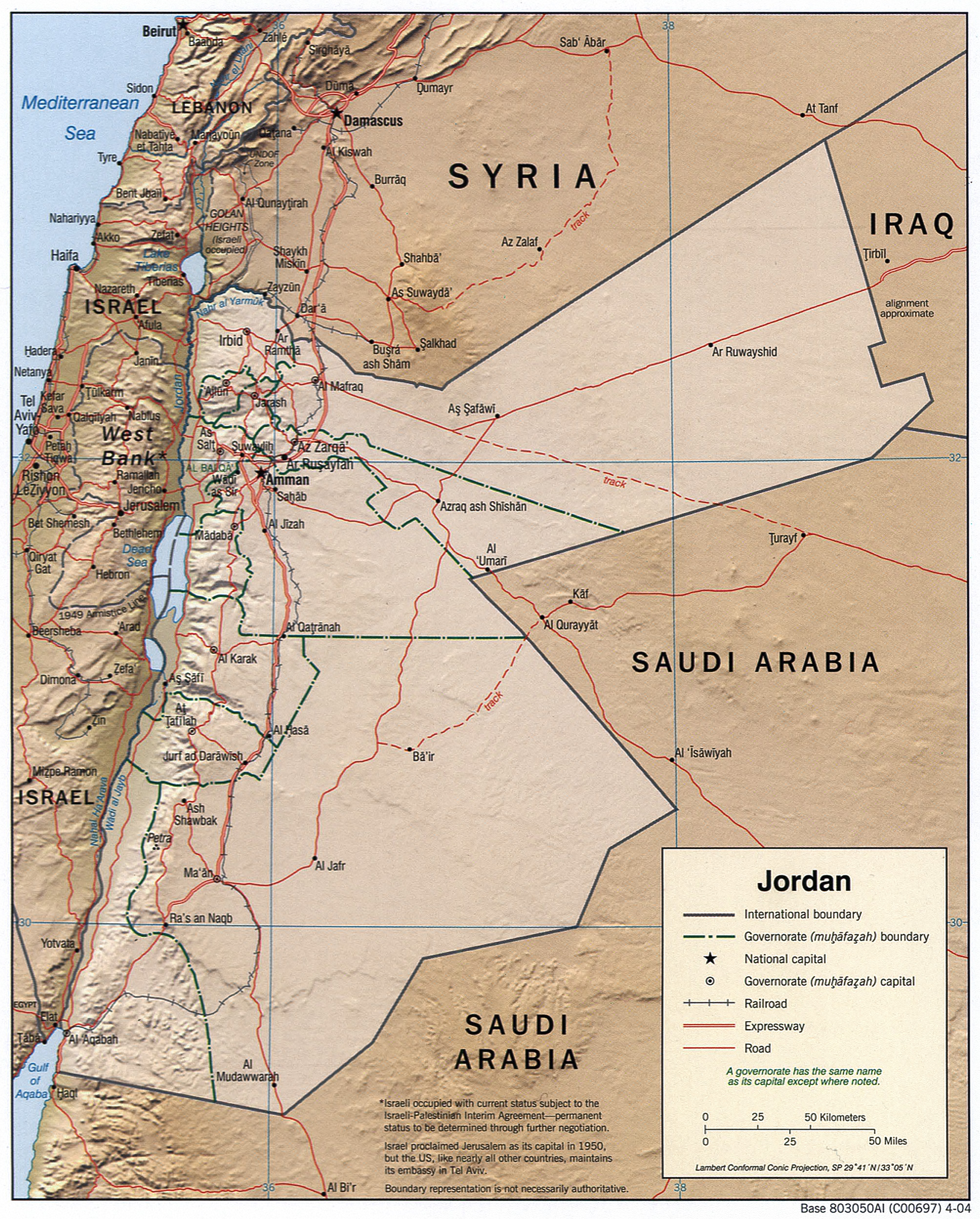
Relief map of Jordan

The following outline is provided as an overview of and topical guide to Jordan:

Jordan – country located in the Levant region of Western Asia, bordering Syria to the north, Iraq to the north-east, Israel and the Palestinian territories to the west, and Saudi Arabia to the east and south. It shares the coastlines of the Dead Sea with Israel and the Gulf of Aqaba with Israel, Saudi Arabia and Egypt. Jordan is a constitutional monarchy with representative government. The reigning monarch is the head of state, the chief executive and the commander-in-chief of the armed forces. The king exercises his executive authority through the prime ministers and the Council of Ministers, or cabinet. The cabinet, meanwhile, is responsible before the elected House of Deputies which, along with the House of Notables (Senate), constitutes the legislative branch of the government. The judicial branch is an independent branch of the government.

== Increasing Urbanization ==
Jordan's population became significantly urbanized during the sixties, reaching a rate of urbanization of over 80% in 2011. This is due to Rural to urban migration, the arrival of refugees from Palestine and Syria, and displaced persons who mostly settled in camps and services of UNRWA.

== General reference ==
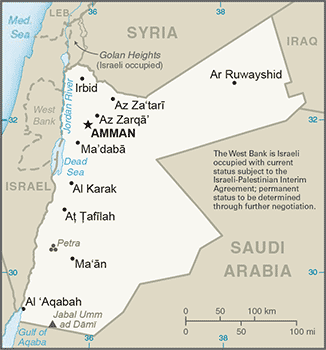
A basic map of Jordan

- Pronunciation: /ˈdʒɔːrdən/
- Common English country name: Jordan
- Official English country name: The Hashemite Kingdom of Jordan.
- Common endonym(s):
- Official endonym(s):
- Adjectival(s): Jordanian
- Demonym(s):
- Etymology: Name of Jordan
- International rankings of Jordan
- ISO country codes: JO, JOR, 400
- ISO region codes: See ISO 3166-2:JO
- Internet country code top-level domain: .jo

== Geography of Jordan ==
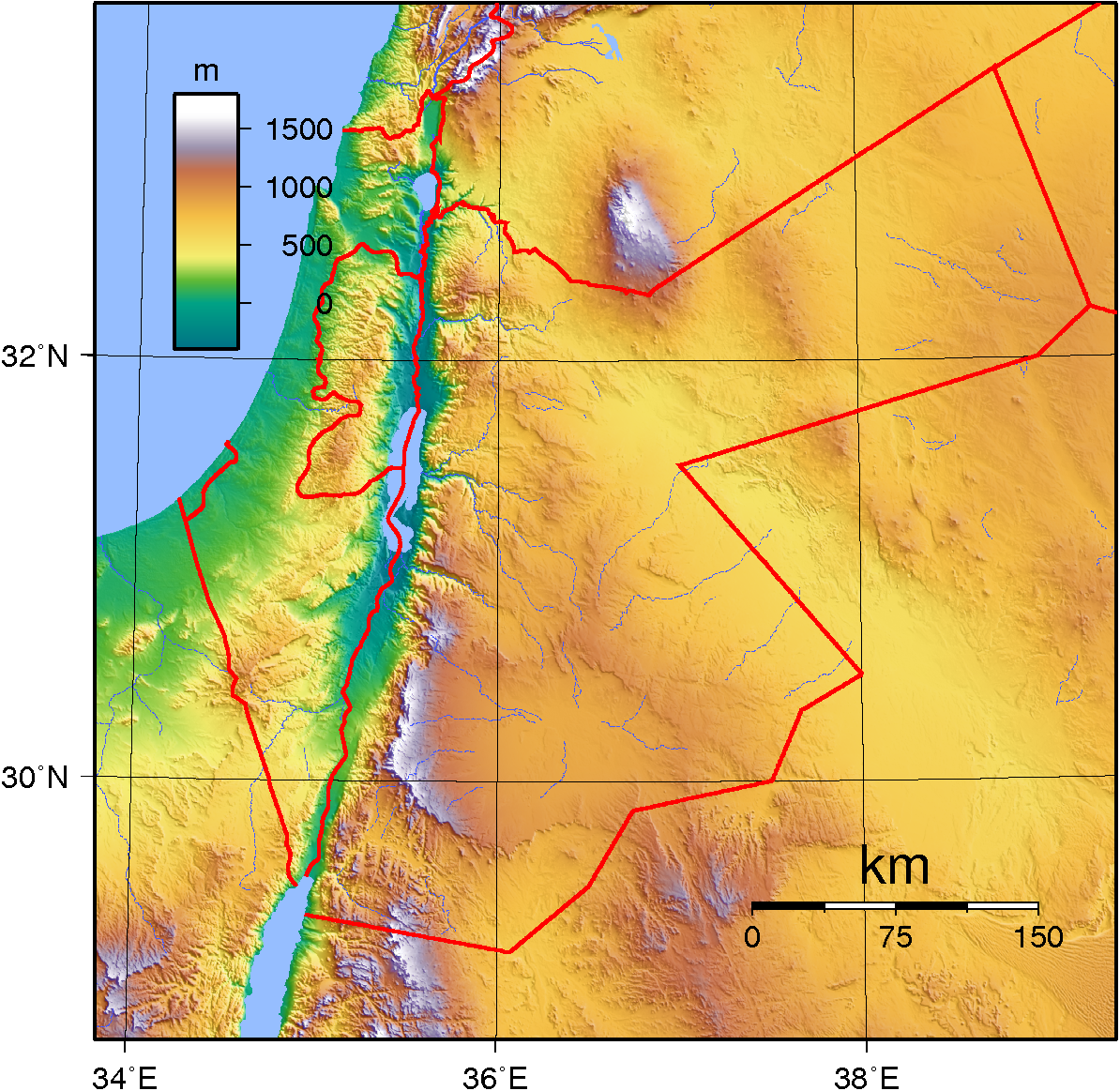
A topographic map of Jordan

Geography of Jordan

- Jordan is: an Arab country
- Location:
  - Northern Hemisphere and Eastern Hemisphere
  - Eurasia
    - Asia
      - Southwest Asia
  - Middle East
    - The Levant
  - Time zone: UTC+02, summer UTC+03
  - Extreme points of Jordan
    - High: Jabal Umm ad Dami 1,854 m (6,083 ft)
    - Low: Dead Sea −412 m (−1,352 ft) – lowest point on the surface of the Earth
  - Land boundaries: 1,635 km

Saudi Arabia 744 km
Syria 375 km
Israel 238 km
Iraq 181 km
Palestinian territories 97 km

- Coastline: Gulf of Aqaba 26 km

- Population of Jordan: 5,924,000 - 84th most populous country
- Area of Jordan: 89,342 km^{2}
- Atlas of Jordan

=== Environment of Jordan ===
Satellite map of the Middle East with Jordan in the center.

- Climate of Jordan
- Renewable energy in Jordan
- Geology of Jordan
- Protected areas of Jordan
  - Biosphere reserves in Jordan
  - National parks of Jordan
- Wildlife of Jordan
  - Fauna of Jordan
    - Birds of Jordan
    - Mammals of Jordan
  - Nature reserves
- Jordan Radioactive Storage Facility
- Foreign assistance and environmentalism in Jordan

==== Natural geographic features of Jordan ====
- Glaciers of Jordan
- Islands of Jordan
- Lakes of Jordan
- Mountains of Jordan
  - Volcanoes in Jordan
- Rivers of Jordan
  - Waterfalls of Jordan
- Valleys of Jordan
- World Heritage Sites in Jordan

=== Regions of Jordan ===
Regions of Jordan

==== Ecoregions of Jordan ====
List of ecoregions in Jordan

- Ecoregions in Jordan

==== Administrative divisions of Jordan ====
Administrative divisions of Jordan

===== Governorates of Jordan =====
Governorates of Jordan

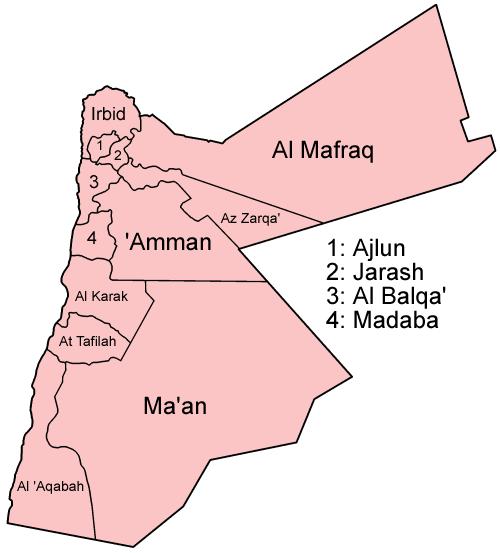
Map of the governorates of Jordan.

Governorates of Jordan
	Governorate	Area (km^{2})	Population	Urban	Rural	Density (people/km^{2})	Capital
1	Irbid	1,572	1,137,100	943,000	194,100	723.4	Irbid
2	Ajloun	420	146,900	111,500	35,400	350.1	Ajloun
3	Jerash	410	191,700	120,100	71,600	467.8	Jerash
4	Mafraq	26,551	300,300	117,800	182,500	11.3	Mafraq
	North Region	28,953	1,776,000	1,292,400	483,600	61.3	
5	Balqa	1,120	428,000	307,400	120,600	382.0	Salt
6	Amman	7,579	2,473,400	2,325,500	147,900	326.3	Amman
7	Zarqa	4,761	951,800	899,800	52,000	199.9	Zarqa
8	Madaba	940	159,700	114,000	45,700	170.0	Madaba
	Central Region	14,400	4,012,900	3,646,700	366,200	278.7	
9	Karak	3,495	249,100	87,200	161,900	71.3	Al Karak
10	Tafilah	2,209	89,400	63,800	25,600	40.5	Tafilah
11	Ma'an	32,832	121,400	66,600	54,800	3.7	Ma'an
12	Aqaba	6,905	139,200	119,700	19,500	20.2	Aqaba
	South Region	45,441	599,100	337,300	261,800	13.2	
	Total	88,794	6,388,000	5,276,400 (82.6%)	1,111,600 (17.4%)	71.9	

===== Nahias of Jordan =====
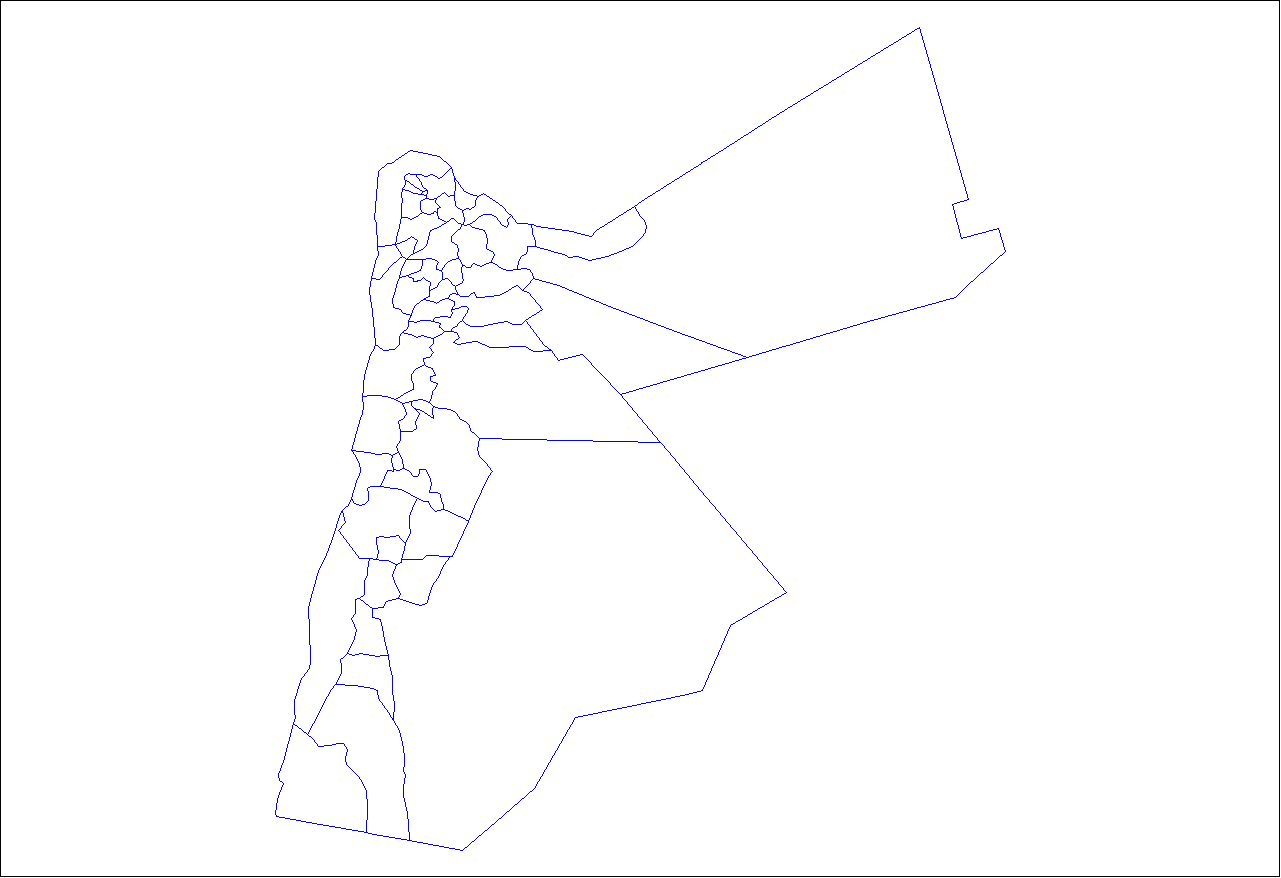
Nahias of Jordan.

Nahias of Jordan

Governorate	Nahia(s)
Ajlun Governorate	Ajlun; Kufranjah
Amman Governorate	Amman; Al Jizah; Al-Muwaqqar; Al-Quwaysimah; University (Jubaiha); Naour; Sahab; Marka; Wadi Al Seer
Aqaba Governorate	Al-Qasabah; Al-Quwairah; Wadi Araba
Balqa Governorate	Al Balqa; Ardhah; Salt; Deir Alla; Al Shuna Al Janubiyya
Irbid Governorate	Al-Aghwar Shamaliyyeh; Ar Ramtha; Bani Kanana; Hariema; Irbid; Al Kora; Al Mazar al Shamali; Al Tayybeh; Wastiyyeh
Jerash Governorate	Jerash
Karak Governorate	Ayy; Faqqu; Al Karak; Al-Mazar al-Januby; Al-Mazra'a; Al-Qasr; Al-Safi
Ma'an Governorate	Al-Husseiniya; Shobak; Ayi; Ma'an; Wadi Musa
Madaba Governorate	Dhiban; Madaba
Mafraq Governorate	Mafraq; Ruwaished; Bal'ama; Sabha; Sama as-Sarhan
Tafilah Governorate	Al-Hasa; Tafilah; Bsaira
Zarqa Governorate	Al-Azraq; Zarqa; Birin

===== Municipalities of Jordan =====
Municipalities of Jordan

- Capital of Jordan: Amman
- Cities of Jordan

=== Demography of Jordan ===
Demographics of Jordan

== Government and politics of Jordan ==
Government of Jordan

- Form of government: parliamentary representative democratic constitutional monarchy
- Capital of Jordan: Amman
- Elections in Jordan
- Political parties in Jordan

=== Branches of the government of Jordan ===
Government of Jordan

==== Executive branch of the government of Jordan ====
- Head of state: Abdullah II, King of Jordan
- Head of government: Awn Shawkat Al-Khasawneh, Prime Minister of Jordan
- Cabinet of Jordan

==== Legislative branch of the government of Jordan ====
- Parliament of Jordan (bicameral)
  - Upper house: Senate of Jordan
  - Lower house: Chamber of Deputies of Jordan

==== Judicial branch of the government of Jordan ====
Court system of Jordan

- Supreme Court of Jordan

=== Foreign relations of Jordan ===
Foreign relations of Jordan

- Diplomatic missions in Jordan
- Diplomatic missions of Jordan

==== International organization membership ====
Jordan is a member of:

- African Union/United Nations Hybrid operation in Darfur (UNAMID)
- Afro-Asian Rural Development Organization (AARDO)
- Anna Lindh Euro-Mediterranean Foundation for the Dialogue Between Cultures
- Arab Atomic Energy Agency (AAEA)
- Arab Authority for Agricultural Investment and Development (AAAID)
- Arab Bank for Economic Development in Africa (ABEDA)
- Arab Board of Health Specializations
- Arab Civil Aviation Commission (ACAC)
- Arab Confederation of Physical Therapy (ACPT)
- Arab Federation for Digital Economy (AFDE)
- Arab Federation for Wildlife Protection (AFWP)
- Arab Federation of Exchanges
- Arab Fund for Economic and Social Development (AFESD)
- Arab Industrial Development, Standardization and Mining Organization (AIDSMO)
- Arab Information and Communication Technologies Organization(AICTO)
- Arab Institute for Training and Research in Statistics (AITRS)
- Arab Inter-parliamentary Union
- Arab Labor Organization (ALO)
- Arab League (AL)
- Arab League Educational, Cultural and Scientific Organization (ALECSO)
- Arab Monetary Fund (AMF)
- Arab Organization of Supreme Audit Institutions (ARABOSAI)
- Arab Organization for Agricultural Development (AOAD)
- Arab Organization of Disabled People
- Arab Planning Institute (API)
- Arab Sea Ports Federation (ASPF)
- Arab States Broadcasting Union
- Arab Towns Organization
- Asian–African Legal Consultative Organization (AALCO)
- Asian Organization of Supreme Audit Institutions (ASOSAI)
- Council of Arab Economic Unity (CAEU)
- Comprehensive Nuclear-Test-Ban Treaty Organization (CTBTO)
- Energy Regulators Regional Association (ERRA)
- European Bank for Reconstruction and Development (EBRD)
- Federation of Arab News Agencies (FANA)
- Food and Agriculture Organization (FAO)
- General Arab Insurance Federation (GAIF)
- General Union of Chambers of Commerce, Industry and Agriculture for Arab Countries
- Group of 77 (G77)
- Inter-Parliamentary Union (IPU)
- International Atomic Energy Agency (IAEA)
- International Bank for Reconstruction and Development (IBRD)
- International Centre for Settlement of Investment Disputes (ICSID)
- International Chamber of Commerce (ICC)
- International Civil Aviation Organization (ICAO)
- International Confederation of Free Trade Unions (ICFTU)
- International Criminal Court (ICCt)
- International Criminal Police Organization (Interpol)
- International Development Association (IDA)
- International Federation of Surveyors (FIG)
- International Federation of Red Cross and Red Crescent Societies (IFRCS)
- International Finance Corporation (IFC)
- International Fund for Agricultural Development (IFAD)
- International Islamic Council for Da'wah and Relief (IICDR)
- International Labour Organization (ILO)
- International Maritime Organization (IMO)
- International Monetary Fund (IMF)
- International Olympic Committee (IOC)
- International Organization for Migration (IOM)
- International Organization for Standardization (ISO)
- International Organization of Securities Commissions (IOSCO)
- International Organization of Supreme Audit Institutions (INTOSAI)
- International Red Cross and Red Crescent Movement (ICRM)
- International Telecommunication Union (ITU)
- International Telecommunications Satellite Organization (ITSO)
- International Trade Union Confederation (ITUC)
- International Union for Conservation of Nature (IUCN)
- International Union for the Protection of New Varieties of Plants (UPOV)
- Islamic Development Bank (IDB)
- Islamic Educational, Scientific and Cultural Organization (ISESCO)
- Multilateral Investment Guarantee Agency (MIGA)
- Nonaligned Movement (NAM)
- Operation Smile
- Organisation of Islamic Cooperation (OIC)
- Organization for Security and Cooperation in Europe (OSCE) (partner)
- Organisation for the Prohibition of Chemical Weapons (OPCW)
- Permanent Court of Arbitration (PCA)
- United Nations (UN)
- United Nations Commission on International Trade Law (UNCITRAL)
- United Nations Conference on Trade and Development (UNCTAD)
- United Nations Economic and Social Commission for Western Asia (ESCWA)
- United Nations Educational, Scientific, and Cultural Organization (UNESCO)
- United Nations High Commissioner for Refugees (UNHCR)
- United Nations Industrial Development Organization (UNIDO)
- United Nations Interim Administration Mission in Kosovo (UNMIK)
- United Nations Mission in Bosnia and Herzegovina (UNMIBH)
- United Nations Mission in the Central African Republic and Chad (MINURCAT)
- United Nations Mission in Liberia (UNMIL)
- United Nations Mission in the Sudan (UNMIS)
- United Nations Mission of Observers in Prevlaka (UNMOP)
- United Nations Mission of Observers in Tajikistan (UNMOT)
- United Nations Observer Mission in Georgia (UNOMIG)
- United Nations Operation in Cote d'Ivoire (UNOCI)
- United Nations Organization Mission in the Democratic Republic of the Congo (MONUC)
- United Nations Relief and Works Agency for Palestine Refugees in the Near East (UNRWA)
- United Nations Stabilization Mission in Haiti (MINUSTAH)
- United Nations Transitional Administration in East Timor (UNTAET)
- Universal Postal Union (UPU)
- World Customs Organization (WCO)
- World Federation of Trade Unions (WFTU)
- World Health Organization (WHO)
- World Intellectual Property Organization (WIPO)
- World Meteorological Organization (WMO)
- World Tourism Organization (UNWTO)
- World Trade Organization (WTO)
- World Organisation for Animal Health (OIE)

=== Law and order in Jordan ===
Law of Jordan

- Constitution of Jordan
- Crime in Jordan
- Human rights in Jordan
  - LGBT rights in Jordan
  - Freedom of religion in Jordan
- Law enforcement in Jordan

=== Military of Jordan ===
Military of Jordan

- Command
  - Commander-in-chief:
    - Ministry of Defence
- Forces
  - Army of Jordan
  - Navy of Jordan
  - Air Force of Jordan
  - Royal Special Forces
  - His Majesty's Special Security
  - Royal Maintenance Corps
  - General Intelligence Department
  - Public Security Directorate
  - Jordan Design and Development Bureau
- Military history
  - Desert Force
  - Arab Legion
  - Transjordan Frontier Force
- Military ranks

=== Local governments in Jordan ===
Local governments in Jordan

== History of Jordan ==
- Military history of Jordan

== Culture of Jordan ==
Culture of Jordan

- Architecture of Jordan
- Cuisine of Jordan
- Festivals in Jordan
- Languages of Jordan
- Media in Jordan
- National symbols of Jordan
  - Coat of arms of Jordan
  - Flag of Jordan
  - National Anthem of Jordan
- People of Jordan
- Prostitution in Jordan
- Public holidays in Jordan
- Records of Jordan
- Religion in Jordan
  - Christianity in Jordan
  - Hinduism in Jordan
  - Islam in Jordan
  - Judaism in Jordan
  - Sikhism in Jordan
- World Heritage Sites in Jordan

=== Art in Jordan ===
- Art in Jordan
- Cinema of Jordan
- Literature of Jordan
- Music of Jordan
- Television in Jordan
- Theatre in Jordan

=== Sports in Jordan ===
Sports in Jordan

- Football in Jordan
- Jordan at the Olympics

== Economy and infrastructure of Jordan ==
Economy of Jordan

- Economic rank, by nominal GDP (2007): 100th (one hundredth)
- Agriculture in Jordan
- Banking in Jordan
  - Central Bank
- Communications in Jordan
  - Internet in Jordan
- Companies of Jordan
- Currency of Jordan: Dinar
  - ISO 4217: JOD
- Economy of Jordan
- Energy in Jordan
  - Energy policy of Jordan
  - Jordan Atomic Energy Commission
  - Oil industry in Jordan
- Mining in Jordan
  - Oil shale in Jordan
- Jordan Stock Exchange
- Tourism in Jordan
  - Petra world heritage site
- Transport in Jordan
  - Airports
  - Railways
  - Royal Jordanian Airlines
  - Aqaba seaport
  - Roads in Jordan
- Water supply and sanitation in Jordan

== Education in Jordan ==
- Education in Jordan
- Science and technology in Jordan

== Health in Jordan ==
Health in Jordan

- Health care in Jordan

== See also ==
Jordan

- List of international rankings
- List of Jordan-related topics
- Member state of the United Nations
- Outline of Asia
- Outline of geography
