= Foreign assistance and environmentalism in Jordan =

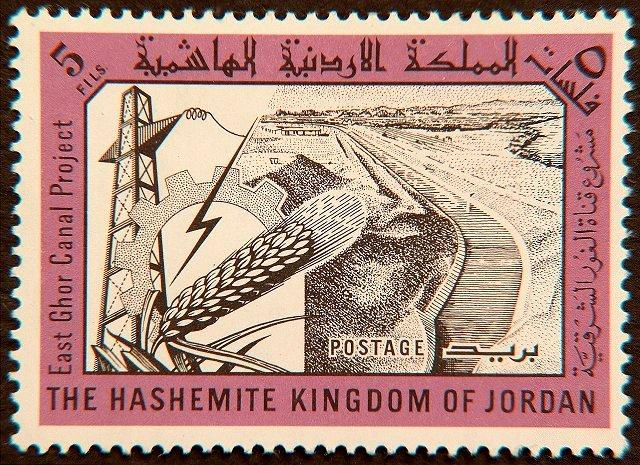
This is a stamp produced in 1963, showing the East Ghor Canal Project. Constructed with foreign aid from USAID, the Canal is one example of how environmental-related issues in Jordan rely on international assistance in multiple ways.

Jordan has been granted considerate amounts of international aid moneys toward environmental conservation. Foreign aid goes into mitigation projects in the areas of water scarcity, loss of arable land for agriculture, and renewable energy. Moreover, foreign aid goes toward the development of the eco-tourism sector. Jordan receives aid from different kinds of international agents. Principal institutions that donate money toward environmentalism in Jordan are the Global Environmental Facility (GEF), United States Agency for International Development (USAID), and World Bank. Recently, Jordan has had problems to control its budgetary deficit, which directly affects its ability to manage its environmental problems. That has made some point out that Jordan depends on International aid to control environmental-related issues. One of the examples of that is related to the construction of the East Ghor Canal.

== Amount of foreign aid on environmentalism ==
Environmental conservation has been well-funded by international aid monies in the last thirty years. Environmental problems in Jordan that receive foreign aid are separated in three areas. These areas are water-related issues, issues related to agriculture, and renewable energy utilization. According to the Brookings Institution, the foreign aid has become a way for Jordanian government mitigate environmental problems related to these three areas. In addition, international aid has also been used to support developmental activities related to the environment, especially eco-tourism and water management. According to the World Bank, Jordan has seen a steep increase in the amount of Net official development assistance received, doubling the amount from 2004 to 2013.

Year	Foreign aid to Environmentalism (in million US$)
2007	US$183.6
2008	US$386.75
2009	US$398.66
2010	US$623.15

For 2007, the Ministry of Planning and International Cooperation (MOPIC) cites that energy, agriculture, and water management retained 12% of international aid from a total of U$680 million. This amount substantially increased over the past few years. In 2010, 30% of foreign aid received by Jordan was utilized toward water management, renewable energy production, and improvements in arable land. Apart from an increase in the percentage rate, there has been also a considerable increase in the total amount of foreign aid derived for environmental concerns in Jordan in the period between 2007-2010. In fact, the total amount jumped from U$183.6 million in 2007 to U$623.15 million in 2010. In 2009, the Brookings Institution declared that the Jordanian government was the seventh most efficient government in the Middle East and North Africa. Because certain organizations partner only with countries that use money efficiently, Jordan received a higher increment of aid.

== Types of foreign aid for the environment ==
Jordan Receives various kinds of international assistance that go toward environmentalism. According to the Planning Law No. (68), the Ministry of Planning and International Cooperation (MOPIC) is the governmental institution that should first receive foreign financial assistance. Signed in 1971, the law permits MOPIC to receive four types of grants: budgetary support, donor-managed grants, soft loans, and technical assistance.

- Grants that are transferred as budgetary support: This type of grant will go directly toward environmental projects listed under the planned budget of the country. A major donor of this type of grant is the United States. Other donors are Japan, Germany, and sometimes separate individuals. The United States, for instance, donates money specifically toward eco-tourism in Jordan.
- Grants directly managed by donors: In this form of aid, the donor will demand strict control over how the money is spent. In most cases, the donor aims to implement a finished project in the country. In 2012, the Montreal Fund allocated U$2.7 million for the Ministry of Environment specifically to fight hydro-chlorofluorocarbons (HCFCs), chemicals that deplete the Ozone Layer. This type of grant can also come from a specific country. In 2013, Germany granted €3.3 million to the country to invest on renewable energy, especially wind energy.
- Soft loans: These are loans below the market interest rate. They are paid slowly to the loaner. Various soft loans to Jordan are given by the Global Environmental Facility. Other organizations that give this kind of money are the International Monetary Fund and the World Bank.
- Technical assistance: Technical assistance refers to the assistance given through reports and feasibility analysis. In addition, scholarships and training programs coordinated by donors are placed under this type of foreign aid.

== Partnership with multilateral organizations ==
International aid toward Environmental issues in Jordan comes from multiple donors. According to the Ministry of Planning and International Cooperation, the environmental sector (water, energy, and agriculture) receives grants from international agencies like as Global Environmental Facility (GEF), which has both delivered grants and co-financed projects in the country. The International Fund for Agriculture Development (IFAD), Japan International Cooperation Agency (JICA), multiple United Nations Agencies, the United States Agency for International Development (USAID), and the World Bank also allocated international aid to Jordan for environmental purposes. In addition, the countries of Norway, Spain, and Switzerland also divert money toward environmental issues in Jordan.

=== Jordan and the global environmental facility ===
Since Jordan became a member of the Global Environmental Facility, the organization has granted money to various projects in the country. Present in more than 180 countries and was created in 1992, GEF has various agencies in Jordan. GEF allocates money to three types of projects in Jordan: national projects, regional projects, and small grants. In the national level, it provided more than U$60 million in the form of grants for 29 national Jordanian projects. In some of the national projects, Jordan has had only partial success in reaching the goals set by the GEF. For example, because of inefficient use of aid, a major ecosystems management project in the country was cancelled. Regional programs have received U$167 million in the form of grant. This money has been separated between projects for international waters, such as the Jordan River, biodiversity projects, land degradation, and climate change.

=== USAID and environmentalism ===
United States Agency for International Development (USAID) primarily funds water services and supports eco-tourism in Jordan. Miyahuna (Jordan Water Company) received $30 million from the US to renovate water programs to be more effective and efficient, preventing water loss and inaccurate billing. At this point, Jordan's water loss is around 37%, but is expected to drop to 25% once the renovations are in place.

In November 2014, USAID joined with the ministries of tourism and labour, the Vocational Training Corporation (VTC) and the Higher Education Accreditation Commission as a first step toward cultivating the Pathways to Professionalism Scheme. This is intended to expand the tourism industry in Jordan through training all employees of hotels or other businesses with the intention of promoting all kinds of tourism, including eco-tourism.

USAID has also partnered with the Royal Society for the Conservation of Nature, and over the past 20 years they have particularly focused on the Dana Biosphere Reserve in the Jordan Valley. RSCN worked with NGOs and families in communities to figure out how to best utilize resources. The goal is to focus on ecological sustainability while promoting economic growth. This ideology increased the economic base of Dana, allowing younger generations who left to find a more economically stable environment to return and become involved with the tourism industry. After some years working in Dana, the RSCN expanded eco-tourism programs to other reserves: Aljoun, Wadi Mujib, and Azraq Wetlands. For a complete list of Jordan's nature reserves, see Nature reserves in Jordan.

Environment Minister Taher Shakhshir and US Ambassador to Jordan Alice Wells have met in the past to discuss what has been done via USAID to support Jordan's environmentalism, as well as bring to attention the environmental stresses that have increased in recent years due to many factors, including increased refugee population, specifically from Syria. Wells was cited as saying that “Jordan is one of the most water-scarce countries in the world," maintaining that it is important for Jordan to focus on water policy and efficiency because it is such a water-poor area.

==== Current projects and aid ====
In the Workplace	At Home	Internationally
Established a network of energy engineers in Jordan, complete with training for the workplace	2012 social marketing campaign to raise awareness of how much energy families and companies are using	Formed ties to US-based energy research groups such as the Colorado Public Utility Commission, Arizona Public Service, and Sacramento Municipal Utility District
Provided technology for research purposes	Environmental education programs	
Credited companies that invested in alternative energy sources
Jordan Competitiveness Programme holds job fairs held in Amman aimed at recruiting people in workforce into ecological/sustainable projects: Girls in Tech: empowering women and girls in the technological workplace, focusing on education; Linking Programme with Intel; Aimed to increase participation of women and youth in the workforce, especially in relation to eco-management and water resourcing

==== Agricultural research in Jordan ====
Agricultural research in Jordan stems from several places, including universities and private entities, but the only government-sanctioned group actively researching is the National Center for Agricultural Research and Technology Transfer (NCARTT). In 2003, USAID made up 6% of NCARTT's agricultural research funding. With headquarters just outside Amman, NCARTT uses roughly 50% of Jordan's agricultural research funding. NCARTT has a focus on human resource development, though they are known to have a low salary cap which discourages experienced researchers from participating in their programs.

Many institutions of higher education are likewise involved in agricultural research through funding research centers or educating students about resource management/conservation practices. These research institutions are also funded by USAID.

===== Importance of agricultural research in Jordan =====
Jordan's economy is primarily dependent on the service industry such as tourism and banking, while the agriculture sector made up roughly 2% of Jordan's GDP. Because Jordan experiences difficulties with securing natural resources pertinent to agricultural development, such as water, agricultural research points to areas that need development in order to maintain that sector of Jordan's economy. With fluctuating resources, environmental conservation approaches in Jordan are directed toward resource conservation.

===== History of agricultural research in Jordan =====
- 1950s: Began constructing research institutions in the Jordan Valley
  - Transferred to the Department of Scientific Agricultural Research in 1958
- 1970s: Department of Scientific Research and Agricultural Extension created
  - Most research began in the 1970s when institutions of higher education and other organizations had ready facilities, funding and training
- Ministry of Agriculture restructured in 1980s, creating NCARTT
  - Funded by National Agricultural Development Project (NADP), which was supported jointly by USAID and the Jordan Government

For contextual history of Jordan in relation to agriculture, specifically water, see Water supply and sanitation in Jordan.

== Dependency of environmentalism on foreign aid ==
Jordan has increasingly needed international aid to continue managing environmental issues. The foreign assistance dependency conundrum that strikes environmentalism in Jordan has three key aspects to it: the country's failing taxation system, the changes in foreign policy, and the misuse foreign aid currently. Environmental areas affected by such dependency are Jordan's electric grid, and the development of water projects.

=== Limitations of taxation system ===
The realm of environmentalism is affected by Jordan's failing taxation system. In 2012, Jordan had a budgetary deficit of U$1.2 billion. The Jordanian government took some austerity measurements, such as lowering subsidies on commodities that are not vital for the average Jordanian and increasing state revenues through the Income Tax Law. These measurements were put in place in order to control the country's budgetary deficit. In the same year, Jordan received the third highest amount of aid from the United States per capita, behind Israel and Afghanistan.

However, the challenges faced by the Jordanian government to collect tax revenues have offset the increase in foreign assistance recently. In other words, Jordan's budgetary deficit did not remain under control. This led to an electricity crisis because there were not enough foreign aid in the form of grants and soft loans to support the state budget and development projects. Without enough foreign assistance, the government could not subsidize the renewable and non-renewable electric grid of Jordan.

=== Foreign aid toward environmentalism and foreign policy ===
According to the Washington Post, the amount of aid received by Jordan has influenced the political and social scenario within the country. In fact in 2011, when King Abdullah put pressure for regime change in neighboring Syria, local journalists declared that this showed Jordan's dependence on the West. The country's peace treaty with Israel also demonstrates Jordan's dependence on the West.

"If the Jordanian state had any strategic sense – any real perception of its sustainability – it would try to limit the amount of foreign assistance it receives."

— Riad al Khouri, Jordan Business Week. First Aid, June 2011.

=== Efficiency of foreign aid on environmentalism ===
The increasing amount of foreign aid toward environmentalism has led the country into a position of dependency on external support. Furthermore, the efficiency of the aid has been questioned. One way in which this takes place is the integration of international agencies into government. Looking at the United States and its foreign policy with Jordan demonstrates a good example of this. The United States has filled in the institutional gaps in the environmental sector within the Jordanian government. For instance, the Water, Resources, and Environment Office within USAID plans, builds, and maintains most of the country's hydraulic infrastructure. Constructed with international aid from the USAID between 1959 and 1987, the East Ghor Canal Project pioneered the large scale environmental project coordinated by foreign agencies and exemplifies a project of extreme necessity for the Jordan people that needed international help. In fact, the construction of the canal took place only after Jordan complied to the United States requirements to not explore other sources of water.
