= Geology of Jordan =

The geology of Jordan includes thick sedimentary sequences of sandstone, marl and evaporites atop ancient Precambrian crystalline igneous and metamorphic basement rock.

== Geologic history, stratigraphy and tectonics ==
Some of the oldest rocks exposed at the surface in Jordan are situated in the southern Wadi al 'Arabah and date to the Proterozoic. Precambrian basement rock intrusions in the south include aplite, diorite, gabbro and granodiorite. From east to west, the number of dikes in Precambrian rocks increases.

=== Paleozoic (539-251 million years ago) ===
East of the Jordan River Valley, the land surface eroded to a nearly flat peneplain and many Proterozoic sediments were eroded. Before Cambrian sediments began to accumulate quartz porphyry lavas erupted to the surface. Tectonic conditions favored the preservation of Proterozoic sediments in the Wadi al'Arabah as Cambrian sandstones began to form.

The continental, marine and calcareous sandstones accumulated as the Tethys Ocean transgressed the region, followed by a late Cambrian marine regression marked by a return to more terrestrial sandstones. During the Ordovician a new transgression flooded more of the land surface, leading to argillite deposition and marine conditions persisted through most of the Silurian except for a mid-Silurian interruption of red-brown sandstones. Nearshore and continental conditions persisted through the Carboniferous, recorded by calcareous and continental sandstones.

=== Mesozoic (251-66 million years ago) ===
The Tethys Ocean transgressed the landscape in the Triassic, leaving a new sequence of sedimentary rocks with a disconformity with underlying Paleozoic rocks. Sea levels dropped in the Late Triassic and then rose in the Jurassic.

Volcanism and uplift came in advance of early Cretaceous deposition. A major marine transgression reach the current Jordan River. Marl and siliceous rocks deposited during continued transgression in the Albian, Turonian, Santonian, Campanian and Maastrichtian, while continental deposition took place in the Nubo-Arabian Shield in the southeast. The Sirhan Basin, Al Jafr Basin and Al Azraq Wadi all accumulated significant sediment thicknesses. Chert and phosphorite layers are common from the period. On June 2, 2025 it was reported that Jordanian scientist Abbas Haddadin has uncovered seeds preserved in amber from the Zarqa Sea region, dating back 140 million years, making them the oldest such specimens ever found. This discovery suggests that during this period, Jordan had a tropical, humid, and rainy climate and was situated along the coast of the ancient Sea of Tethys.

=== Cenozoic (66 million years ago-present) ===
At the beginning of the Cenozoic, through the Paleocene and Eocene, similar deposition to the Cretaceous took place, including bituminous limestone and marl. Rifting began in the Oligocene, forming the Jordan Rift Valley. The resulting depression was probably occupied by a sequence of lakes or shallow marine environments.

From the Miocene through the Pliocene, a marine environment that may have been a branch of the Mediterranean reached the Red Sea through the Rift Valley, reaching basalt flows in Djebel ed Drouz. Up to four kilometers of evaporites formed into the early Pleistocene.

== See also ==
- Midian Mountains
