= International rankings of Jordan =

International rankings by country

The following are the international rankings of Jordan.

== Cities ==
- Amman was ranked as a "Gamma+" world city in the GaWC World Cities 2024 report.

== Economy ==
- The Wall Street Journal and The Heritage Foundation: Index of Economic Freedom 2016, ranked 38 out of 179 countries
- International Monetary Fund:
  - GDP (PPP) per capita, 2025, ranked 121st out of 186 countries.
  - GDP (nominal), 2025, ranked 91st out of 194 countries.

== Environment ==
- Yale Center for Environmental Law and Policy and the Center for International Earth Science Information Network: Environmental Performance Index 2024, ranked 77 out of 180 countries.

== Globalization ==
- KOF Swiss Economic Institute: Globalization Index 2024, ranked 46th out of 215 countries.

== Politics ==
- Transparency International: Corruption Perceptions Index 2024, ranked 59th out of 179 countries
- Reporters Without Borders: Press Freedom Index 2020, ranked 147th out of 180 countries
- Freedom House: Freedom in the World, 2025 rated "Partly Free"

== Society ==
- Institute for Economics and Peace: Global Peace Index 2024, ranked 67th out of 163 countries.
- United Nations Development Programme: Human Development Index 2025, ranked 100th out of 193 countries and territories.

== Technological ==
- World Intellectual Property Organization: Global Innovation Index 2026, ranked 60 out of 139 countries
