= Arab Board of Health Specializations =

Health organization

- Established: 1978
- President: Dr. Ahmed bin Mohammed Al Saidi
- Location: Syria
- Coordinates: 33°29′58″N 36°14′12″E
- Website: http://arab-board.org/en

The Arab Board of Health Specializations was established in 1978 in Damascus, Syria, under the decision of the Council of Arab Ministers of Health of the Arab League. The aims are to improve health services in the Arab world by raising the scientific and practical level in various specializations. This is a non-profit educational institute.

== Board system ==
The Council has a statute that includes the general rules related to its formations and the conditions for membership in each of them. The Supreme Council of the Board shall issue an internal regulation in addition to regulations that include all details related to procedural, administrative, financial, and technical affairs.

== Executive office meeting ==
On 18 December 2021, the 4th meeting of the Executive Office took place in Jordan. The meeting decided on multiple matters related to its operations.

== Journal ==
The Journal of the Arab Board of Medical Specializations is a medical journal, issued quarterly encompassing all medical Specializations. Archive for old journal are still available for free.

== Collaborations ==
WHO has signed an agreement with the Arab Board of Health Specializations to promote family practice in the Region. One of the main expected results of the agreement is to develop institutional capacity by producing a cadre of qualified family doctors at regional and country level. A Memorandum of Understanding is present with The Royal College of Pathologists United Kingdom for improving training and facilities.
