= Qaṣabah al-'Aqabah =

Governorate of Jordan

Qaṣabah al-'Aqabah قصبة العقبة
- District
- Location within Jordan
- Coordinates: 29.98236°N 35.22858°E
- Country: Jordan
- Governorate: Aqaba

Area
  - Total: 4,343 km^{2} (1,677 sq mi)

Population (2015 census)
  - Total: 159,018
  - Density: 36.61/km^{2} (94.83/sq mi)
- Time zone: GMT +2
  - Summer (DST): +3

Qaṣabah al-'Aqabah is one of the districts of Aqaba governorate, Jordan.
