= Al-Qūaīrah =

Governorate of Jordan

- District
- Location within Jordan
- Coordinates: 29.5917°N 35.5156°E
- Country: Jordan
- Governorate: Aqaba
- Seat: Al-Quweira

Area
  - Total: 2,560 km^{2} (990 sq mi)

Population (2015 census)
  - Total: 29,142
  - Density: 11.4/km^{2} (29.5/sq mi)
- Time zone: GMT +2
  - Summer (DST): +3

Al-Qūaīrah (Arabic: القويرة) is one of the districts of Aqaba governorate, Jordan.
