= Agriculture in Jordan =

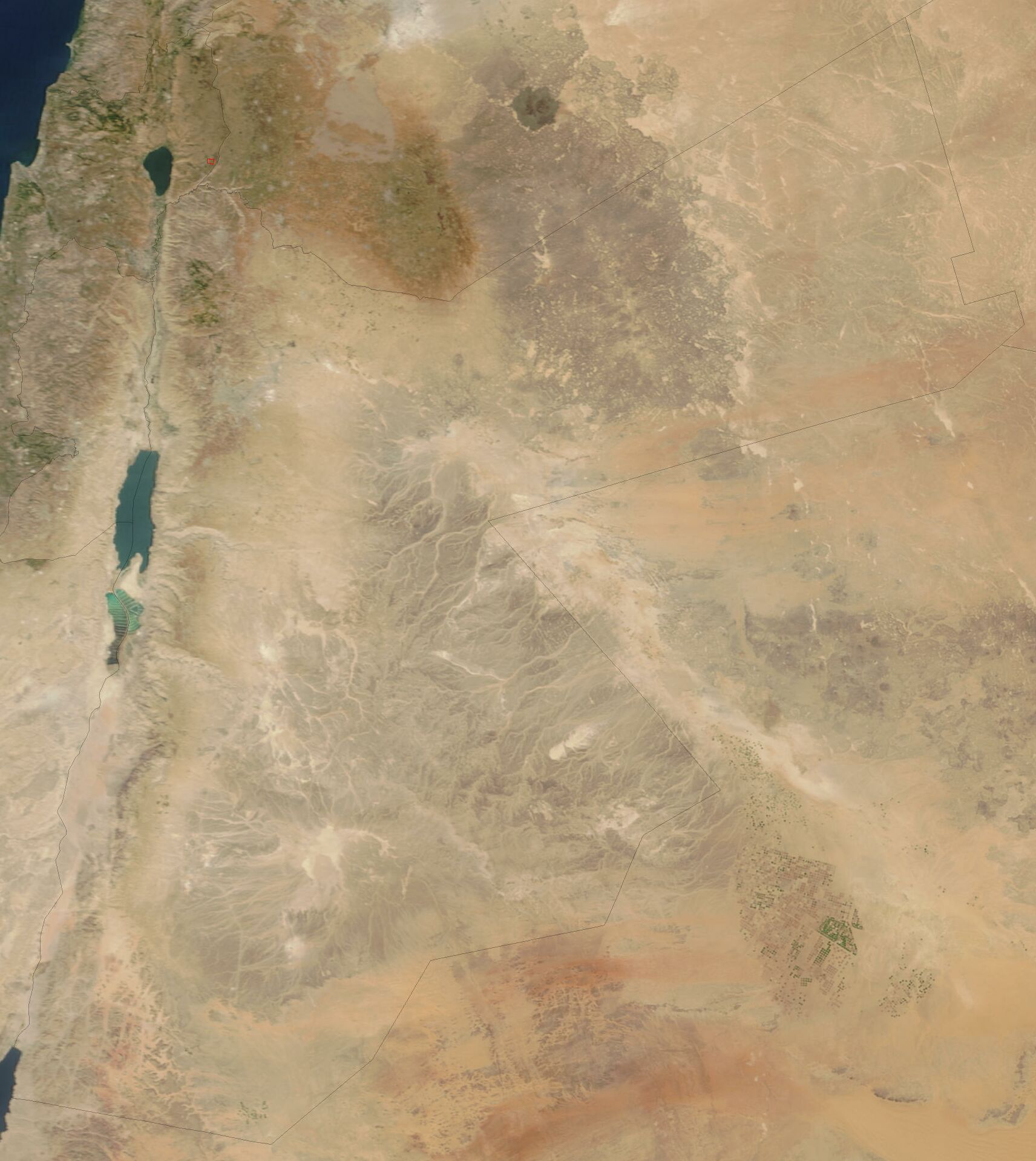
Satellite image of Jordan

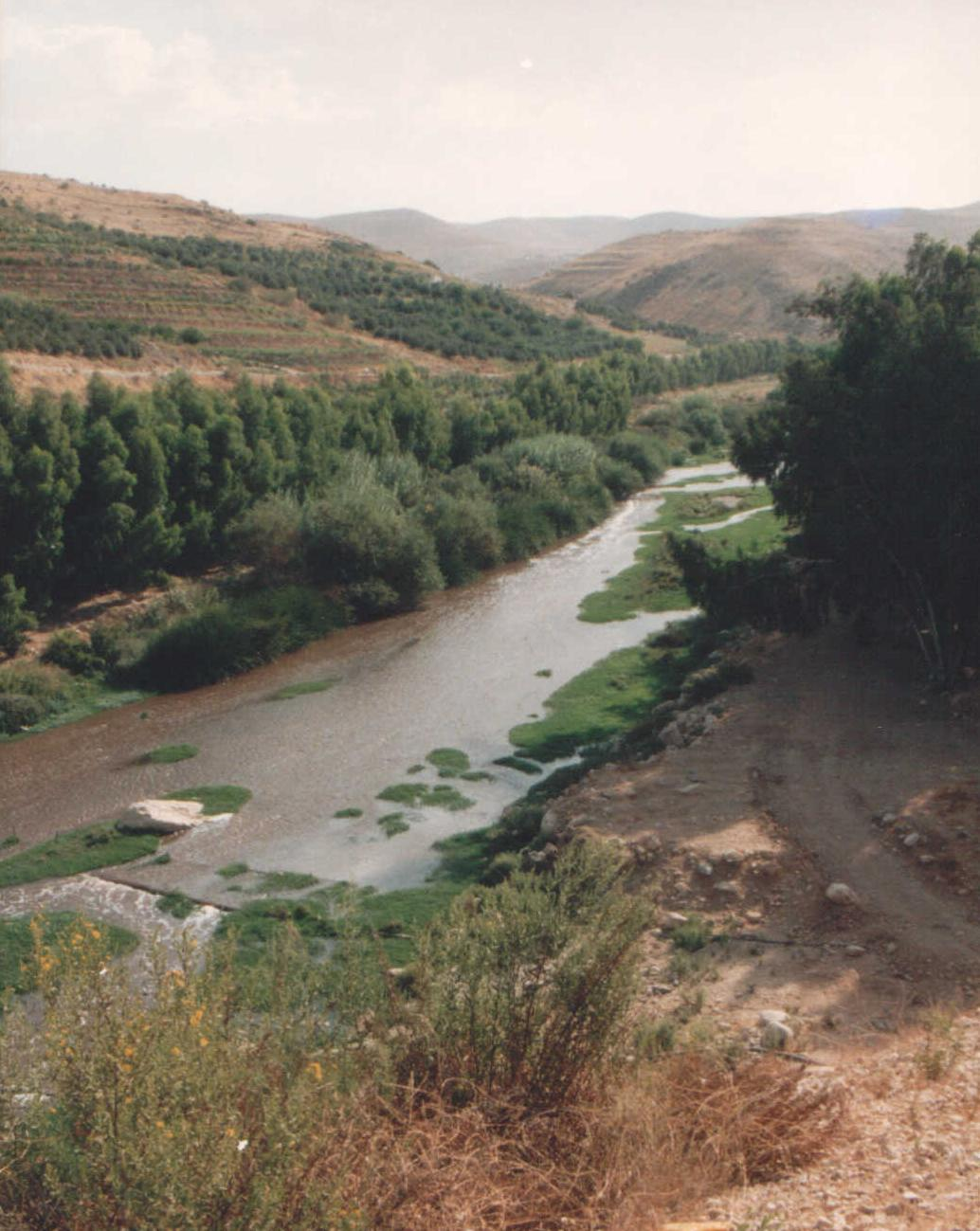
Zarqa River

Agriculture in Jordan contributed substantially to the economy at the time of Jordan's independence, but it subsequently suffered a decades-long steady decline. In the early 1950s, agriculture constituted almost 40 percent of GNP; on the eve of the Six-Day War, it was 17 percent (including produce from the West Bank, which was under Jordan's mandate at the time.).

By the mid-1980s, agriculture's share of GNP in Jordan was only about 6 percent. In contrast, in Syria and Egypt agriculture constituted more than 20 percent of GNP in the 1980s. Several factors contributed to this downward trend. With the Israeli occupation of the West Bank, Jordan lost prime farmland that Jordan had been running since 1949. Starting in the mid-1970s, Jordanian labor emigration also hastened the decline of agriculture. Many Jordanian abandoned the land to take more lucrative jobs abroad. Others migrated to cities where labor shortages had led to higher wages for manual workers. Deserted farms were built over as urban areas expanded. As the Jordanian government drove up interest rates to attract remittance income, farm credit tightened, which made it difficult for farmers to buy seed and fertilizer.

In striking contrast to Egypt and Iraq, where redistribution of land irrigated by the Nile and Euphrates rivers was a pivotal political, social, and economic issue, land tenure was never an important concern in Jordan. More than 150,000 foreign laborers—mainly Egyptians—worked in Jordan in 1988, most on farms. Moreover, since the early 1960s, the government has continuously created irrigated farmland from what was previously arid desert, further reducing competition for arable land. Ownership of rain-fed land was not subject to special restrictions. Limited land reform occurred in the early 1960s when, as the government irrigated the Jordan River valley, it bought plots larger than twenty hectares (50 acres), subdivided them, and resold them to former tenants in three-hectare to five-hectare plots. Because the land had not been very valuable before the government irrigated it, this process was accomplished with little controversy. In general, the government has aimed to keep land in larger plots to encourage efficiency and mechanized farming. The government made permanently indivisible the irrigated land that it granted or sold so as to nullify traditional Islamic inheritance laws that tended to fragment land.

== Agricultural development ==
Although the agricultural sector's share of GNP declined in comparison with other sectors of the economy, farming remained economically important and production grew in absolute terms. Between 1975 and 1985, total production of cereals and beans rose by almost 150 percent, and production of vegetables rose by more than 200 percent, almost all of the increase occurring between 1975 and 1980. Production of certain cash export crops, such as olives, tobacco, and fruit, more than quadrupled. Because farming had remained labor-intensive, by one estimate about 20 percent to 30 percent of the male work force continued to depend on farming for its livelihood.

Even with increased production, the failure of agriculture to keep pace with the growth of the rest of the economy, however, resulted in an insufficient domestic food supply. Jordan thus needed to import such staples as cereals, grains, and meat. Wheat imports averaged about 350,000 tons (12.9 million bushels) per year, ten to twenty times the amount produced domestically. Red meat imports cost more than JD30 million per year, and onion and potato imports cost between JD3 million and JD4 million per year. Between 1982 and 1985, the total food import bill averaged about JD180 million per year, accounting for more than 15 percent of total imports during the period. At the same time, cash crop exports—for example, the export of 7,000 metric tons of food to Western Europe in 1988—generated about JD40 million per year, yielding a net food deficit of JD140 million. One emerging problem in the late 1980s was the erosion of Jordan's traditional agricultural export market. The wealthy oil-exporting states of the Arabian Peninsula, concerned about their "food security," were starting to replace imports from Jordan with food produced domestically at costs far higher than world market prices, using expensive desalinated water.

Jordan's population growth has increased the demand for food. However, Jordan imports the vast majority of its basic food crops, including nearly 100% of cereals. The agriculture sector has been growing and has doubled its share of GDP from 2-4% in the past 5 years the main driven by domestic demand. One significant challenge for the Agriculture sector is that while it provides just 19% of Jordan's food requirements and employs only 1.8% of Jordan's workforce, it withdraws 65% of Jordan's freshwater resources.

Since gaining independence, Jordan's agricultural sector has experienced significant growth, with the added value of its production reaching JD1.691 billion and registering a 9% growth rate. Vegetable production has increased by 91%, and fruit tree produce has risen by 141%, expanding to meet both local and international demand. Jordanian agricultural products now reach 112 countries, with exports rising by 441% to JD1.5 billion. Livestock numbers have grown by 54%, totaling 3.8 million animals, and the value of animal products has increased by 279% to JD1.305 billion. Employment in the sector has grown by 38%, now encompassing 261,000 workers. The Agricultural Credit Corporation's capital has expanded by 213% to JD100 million, providing JD55 million in annual loans to 11,000 farmers. These developments underscore the sector's role in enhancing food security, economic integration, and job creation in rural areas.

== Cropping and production ==
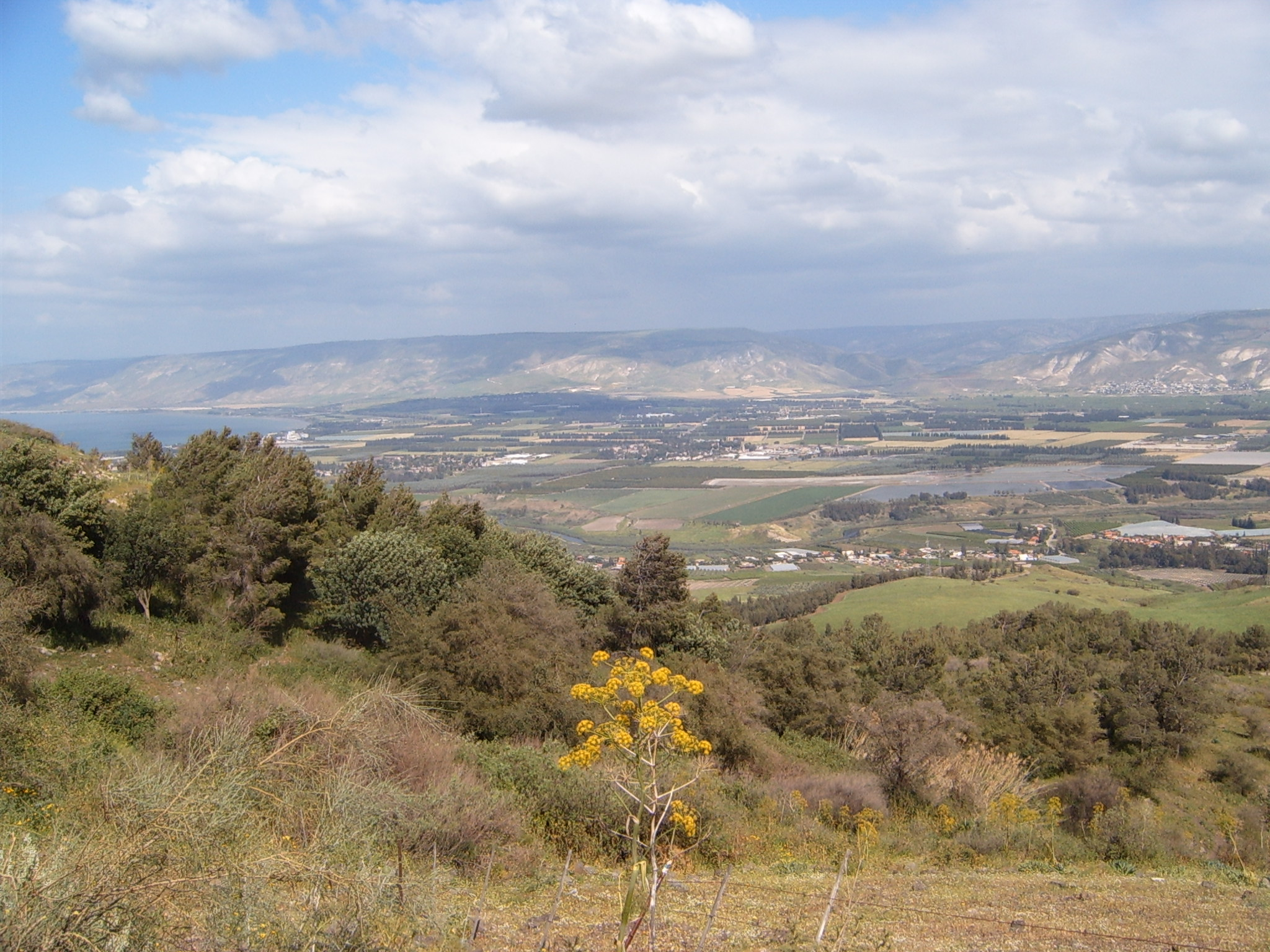
Jordan Valley

Observers expected food imports to remain necessary into the indefinite future. Much of Jordan's soil was not arable even if water were available; by several estimates, between 6 percent and 7 percent of Jordan's territory was arable, a figure that was being revised slowly upward as dry-land farming techniques became more sophisticated. In 1989 the scarcity of water, the lack of irrigation, and economic problems, rather than the lack of arable land set a ceiling on agricultural potential. Only about 20 percent of Jordan's geographic area received more than 200 millimeters of rainfall per year, the minimum required for rain-fed agriculture. Much of this land was otherwise unsuitable for agriculture. Moreover, rainfall varied greatly from year to year, so crops were prone to be ruined by periodic drought.

In 1986 only about 5.5 percent (about 500,000 hectares), of the East Bank's 9.2 million hectares (230 million acres) were under cultivation. Fewer than 40,000 hectares (100,000 acres) were irrigated, almost all in the Jordan River valley. Because arable, rain-fed land was exploited extensively, future growth of agricultural production depended on increased irrigation. Estimates of the additional area that could be irrigated were Jordan to maximize its water resources ranged between 65,000 and 100,000 hectares (160,000 and 250,000 acres).

Most agricultural activity was concentrated in two areas. In rain-fed northern and central areas of higher elevation, wheat, barley, and other field crops such as tobacco, lentils, barley, and chick peas were cultivated; olives also were produced in these regions. Because of periodic drought and limited area, the rain-fed uplands did not support sufficient output of cereal crops to meet domestic demand.

In the more fertile Jordan River valley, fruits and vegetables including cucumbers, tomatoes, eggplants, melons, bananas, and citrus crops often were produced in surplus amounts. The Jordan River Valley received little rain, and the main source of irrigation water was the East Ghor Canal, which was built in 1963 with United States aid.

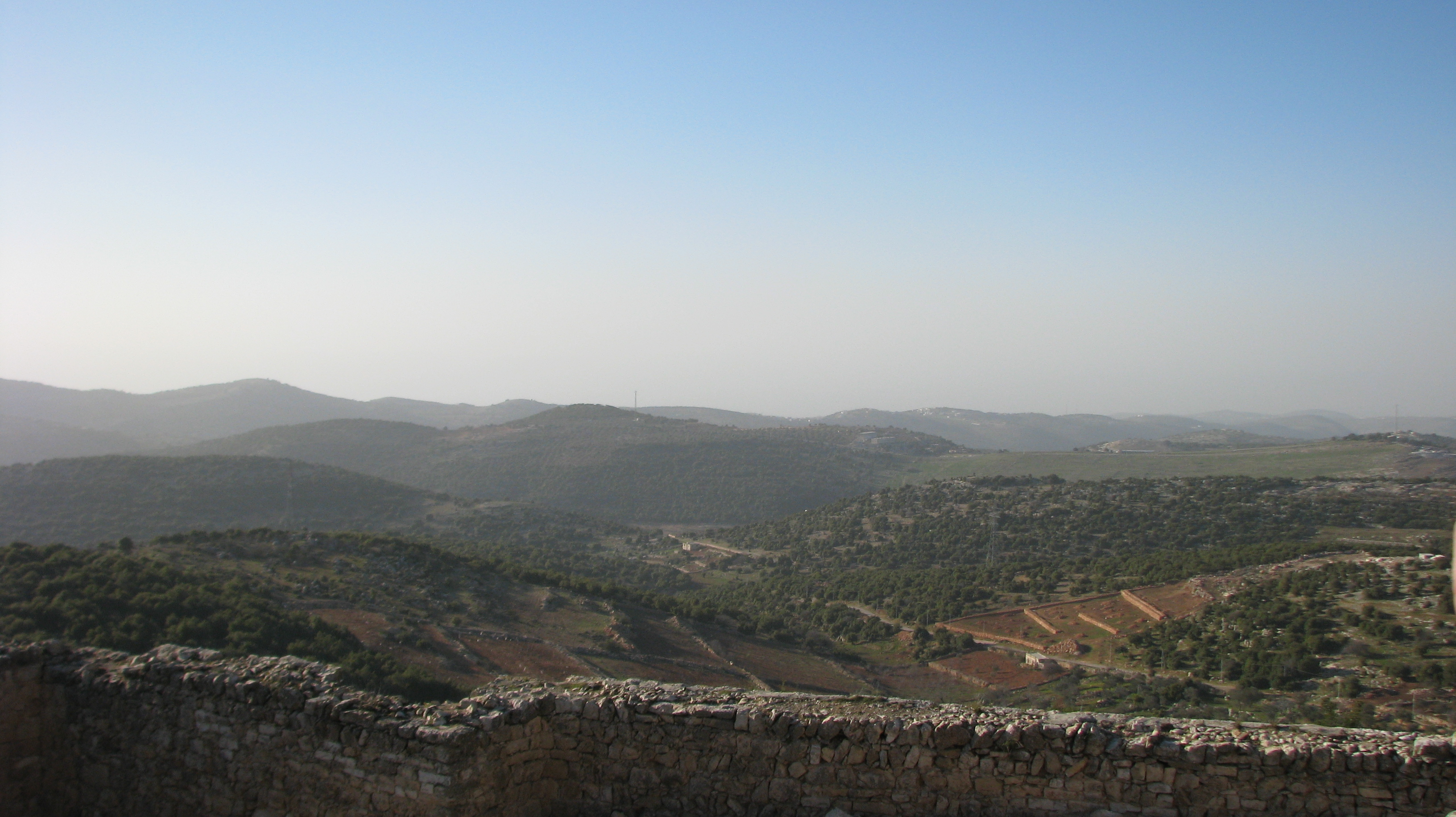
Farmland in Jordan

Although the country's ultimate agricultural potential was small, economic factors apparently limited production more than environmental constraints, as reflected by up to 100,000 hectares of potentially arable land that lay fallow in the late 1980s. The government has expressed considerable concern about its "food security" and its high food import bill, and it was implementing plans to increase crop production in the 1990s. Growth in agricultural output was only about 4 percent during the 1980-85 Five-Year Plan, despite investment of approximately JD80 million during the period, indicating the slow pace of progress.

In the late 1980s, Jordan was implementing a two-pronged agricultural development policy. The long-term strategy was to increase the total area under cultivation by better harnessing water resources to increase irrigation of arid desert areas for the cultivation of cereal crops, the country's most pressing need. In the short term, the government was attempting to maximize the efficiency of agricultural production in the Jordan River valley through rationalization or use of resources to produce those items in which the country had a relative advantage.

Rationalization started with a controversial 1985 government decision to regulate cropping and production, primarily in the Jordan River valley. Farmers there had repeatedly produced surpluses of tomatoes, cucumbers, eggplants, and squashes because they were reliable and traditional crops. At the same time, underproduction of crops such as potatoes, onions, broccoli, celery, garlic, and spices led to unnecessary imports. The government offered incentives to farmers to experiment with new crops and cut subsidy payments to those who continued to produce surplus crops. In 1986 cucumber production dropped by 25 percent to about 50,000 metric tons and tomato harvests dropped by more than 33 percent to 160,000 metric tons, while self-sufficiency was achieved in potatoes and onions.

Production of wheat and other cereals fluctuated greatly from year to year, but never came close to meeting demand. In 1986, a drought year, Jordan produced about 22,000 tons (810,000 bu) of wheat, down from 63,000 tons (2,300,000 bu) in 1985. In 1987 Jordan harvested about 130,000 tons (4,800,000 bu), a record amount. Because even a bumper crop did not meet domestic demand, expansion of dry-land cereal farming in the southeast of the country was a major agricultural development goal of the 1990s. One plan called for the irrigation of a 7,500-hectare area east of Khawr Ramm (known as Wadi Rum) using 100 million cubic meters per year (80,000 ac·ft/yr) of water pumped from a large underground aquifer. Another plan envisioned a 7,500-hectare (19,000-acre) cultivated area in the Wadi al Arabah region south of the Jordan River valley using desalinated water from the Red Sea for irrigation.

The Jordan Valley represents the major area for agricultural production in Jordan. As of June 19, 2025, Jordanian Ministry of Industry has announced that Joradan's wheat reserves can provide the country's consumption for the next 10 months and Barley for the next 8 months. This was published as part of Jordan's efforts and strategies to ensure food security. Later that year Secretary-General of the Jordan Valley Authority, Eng. Hisham Al-Hayasa said that the Jordan Valley has a water loss of up to 27% and it is needed to intensify efforts to enforce laws and monitor water resource usage.

== Livestock ==
Livestock production was limited in the late 1980s. Jordan had about 35,000 head of cattle but more than 1 million sheep and 500,000 goats, and the government planned to increase their numbers. In the late 1980s, annual production of red meat ranged between 10,000 and 15,000 metric tons, less than 33 percent of domestic consumption. A major impediment to increased livestock production was the high cost of imported feed. Jordan imported cereals at high cost for human consumption, but imported animal feed was a much lower priority. Likewise, the arid, rain-fed land that could have been used for grazing or for fodder production was set aside for wheat production. Jordan was self-sufficient, however, in poultry meat production (about 35,000 metric tons) and egg production (about 400,000 eggs), and exported these products to neighboring countries.

== Agricultural research and development ==
=== History ===
Agricultural development in Jordan has historically been concentrated on barley, wheat, and olives. In the late 1920s and early 1930s, the emirate suffered from a severe drought which saw agricultural output plummet. In response, Sheikh Mithqal Al-Fayez of the Bani Sakher, imported the first mechanical tractor, which helped significantly alleviate the country's food shortages.

The establishment of the Ministry of Agriculture in 1949 and had the task of making some agricultural experiments. Established the first agricultural research station in Deir Alla in 1958. In 1985 the establishment of the National Center for Agricultural Research and Technology Transfer. In 2007 the integration of research and extension under the name of the National Center for Agricultural Research and Extension. In 1972 established the first School of Agriculture / University of Jordan. In 1986 established the Faculty of Agriculture at the University of Science and Technology and the Faculty of Agriculture of Jordan in Jerash in 1993 and the College of Agriculture at the University of Muta in 1995 and in 1998 established the College of Agriculture at the University of Balqa Applied.

=== Agricultural research institutions in Jordan ===
- National Agricultural Research Center (NARC):

consists of a main headquarter in Amman and seven regional centers located in Dair Alla, Ramtha, Mafraq, Mshaggar, Rabba, Tafilleh, and Shobbak. NCARE also operates (13) research stations representing different agro-ecological conditions such as Maru (Irbid) station.

- Colleges of agriculture in the Jordanian universities.
- Institutions, non-governmental organizations (Higher Council for Science and Technology, the Royal Scientific Society, the Society of Friends of Scientific Research, the Farmers' Union).
- The private sector.
- Regional institutions and research centers (ICARDA, ACSAD, the Arab Center for Studies salt, etc.) and this is working in collaboration with national research institutions .

=== Agricultural workers' rights ===
Jordanian Labor Law excludes agricultural workers from some of its protections and provisions. Many workers in the agricultural sector are immigrant workers and women, who are employed largely through informal labor practices. With respect to the participation of informal labor in the total employment in economic activities, 93% of the activity of "agriculture, forestry, and fishing" employed informal laborers. Agricultural workers also often work long hours (between 10 and 13 hours per day) for meagre wages, and frequently do so under exploitative and unsafe conditions.

== Effects of climate change ==
Jordan's agricultural sector is particularly threatened by climate change and its impacts since it is the largest water user in Jordan. Climate change does not change the challenges in Jordan, which are mainly related to water scarcity. Instead, it is another factor contributing to aggravate the existing shortage, adding to the rapid population growth.
