= Geography of Jordan =

Coordinates: 31°00′N 36°00′E

A map of Jordan.

Jordan is situated geographically in West Asia, south of Syria, west of Iraq, northwest of Saudi Arabia, east of Israel and the Palestinian territory of the West Bank. The area is also referred to as the Middle or Near East. Its territory covers about 91,880 square kilometres (35,480 sq mi).

Between 1950 and the Six-Day War in 1967, although not widely recognized, Jordan claimed and administered an additional 5,880 square kilometres (2,270 sq mi) encompassing the West Bank; in 1988 and with continuing Israeli occupation, King Hussein relinquished Jordan's claim to the West Bank in favor of the Palestinians.

Jordan's only coastline at its southern extremity, where nearly 26 kilometres (16 mi) of shoreline along the Gulf of Aqaba provides access to the Red Sea.

== Area and boundaries ==
Area:

- total: 89,342 square kilometres (34,495 sq mi)
  - country rank in the world: 110th
- land: 88,802 square kilometres (34,287 sq mi)
- water: 540 square kilometres (208 sq mi)

Area comparative

- Australia comparative: slightly more than 1/3 larger than Tasmania
- Canada comparative: approximately 1 1/4 times the size of New Brunswick
- United Kingdom comparative: approximately 1/7 larger than Scotland
- United States comparative: approximately the size of Maine
- EU comparative: approximately the size of Portugal

Boundaries:

- total: 1,744 kilometres (1,084 mi)
- border countries:
  - Egypt: Maritime boundary, Gulf of Aqaba
  - Iraq: 179 kilometres (111 mi)
  - Israel: 307 kilometres (191 mi)
  - Saudi Arabia: 731 kilometres (454 mi)
  - Syria: 379 kilometres (235 mi)
  - West Bank: 148 kilometres (92 mi)

Coastline: 26 kilometres (16 mi)

- note:
  - Jordan also borders the Dead Sea, for 50 kilometres (31 mi)

Maritime claims:

- territorial sea:
  - 3 nmi (5.556 km; 3.452 mi)

Elevation extremes:

- lowest point: Dead Sea −408 metres (−1,339 ft)
- highest point: Jabal Umm ad Dami 1,854 metres (6,083 ft)

=== Boundaries ===
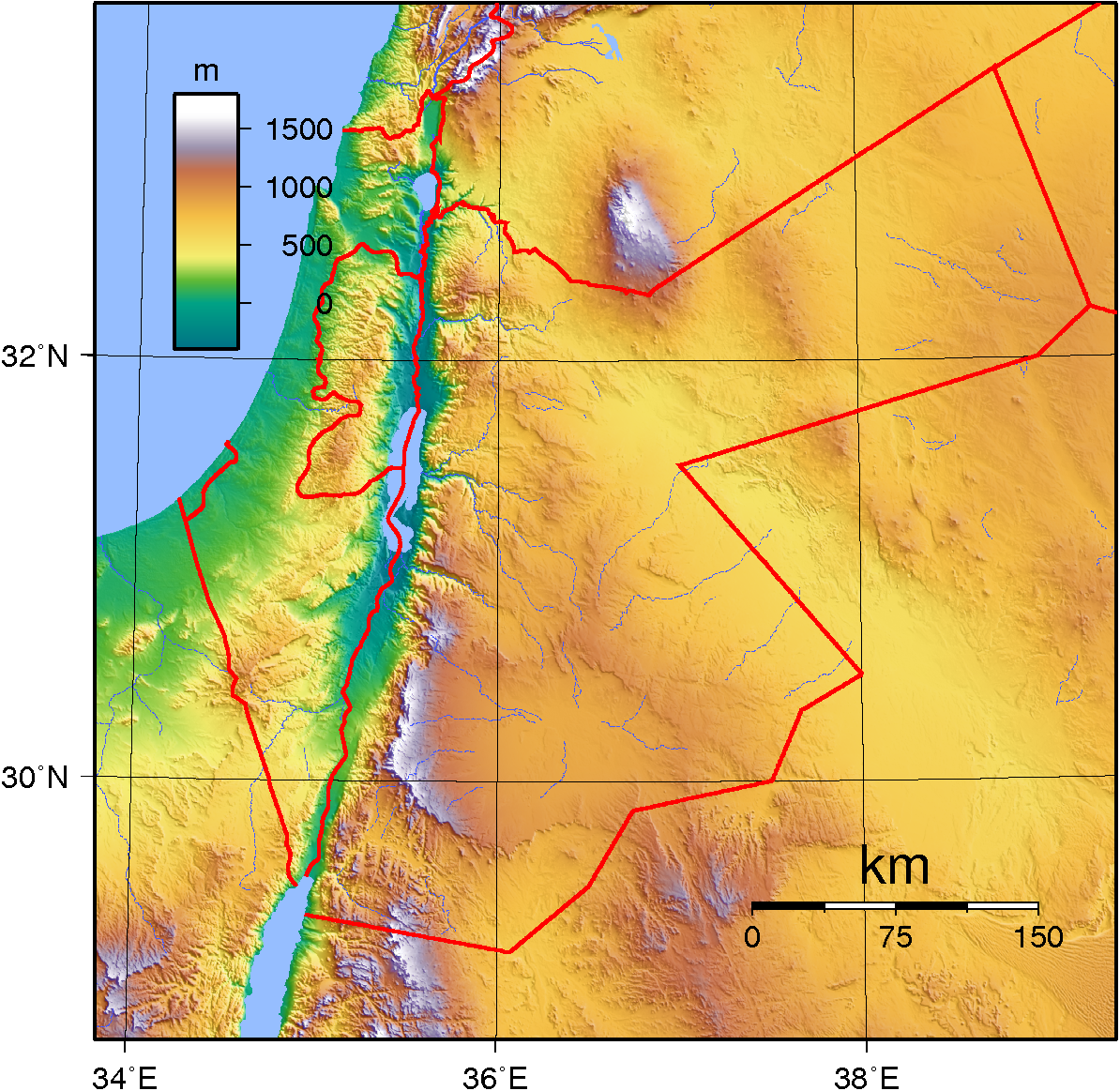
Borders of Jordan.

Except for small sections of the borders with Israel and Syria, Jordan's international boundaries do not follow well-defined natural features of the terrain. The country's boundaries were established by various international agreements and with the exception of the border with Israel, none was in dispute in early 1989.

Jordan's boundaries with Syria, Iraq, and Saudi Arabia do not have the special significance that the border with Israel does; these borders have not always hampered tribal nomads in their movements, yet for a few groups borders did separate them from traditional grazing areas and delimited by a series of agreements between the United Kingdom and the government of what eventually became Saudi Arabia) was first formally defined in the Hadda Agreement of 1925.

Map of 1965 land swap between Jordan and Saudi Arabia

In 1965 Jordan and Saudi Arabia concluded an agreement that realigned and delimited the boundary. Jordan gained 19 kilometers of land on the Gulf of Aqaba and 6,000 square kilometers of territory in the interior, and 7,000 square kilometers of Jordanian-administered, landlocked territory was ceded to Saudi Arabia. The new boundary enabled Jordan to expand its port facilities and established a zone in which the two parties agreed to share petroleum revenues equally if oil were discovered. The agreement also protected the pasturage and watering rights of nomadic tribes inside the exchanged territories.

== Topography ==
A satellite map of the Middle East with Jordan in the center.

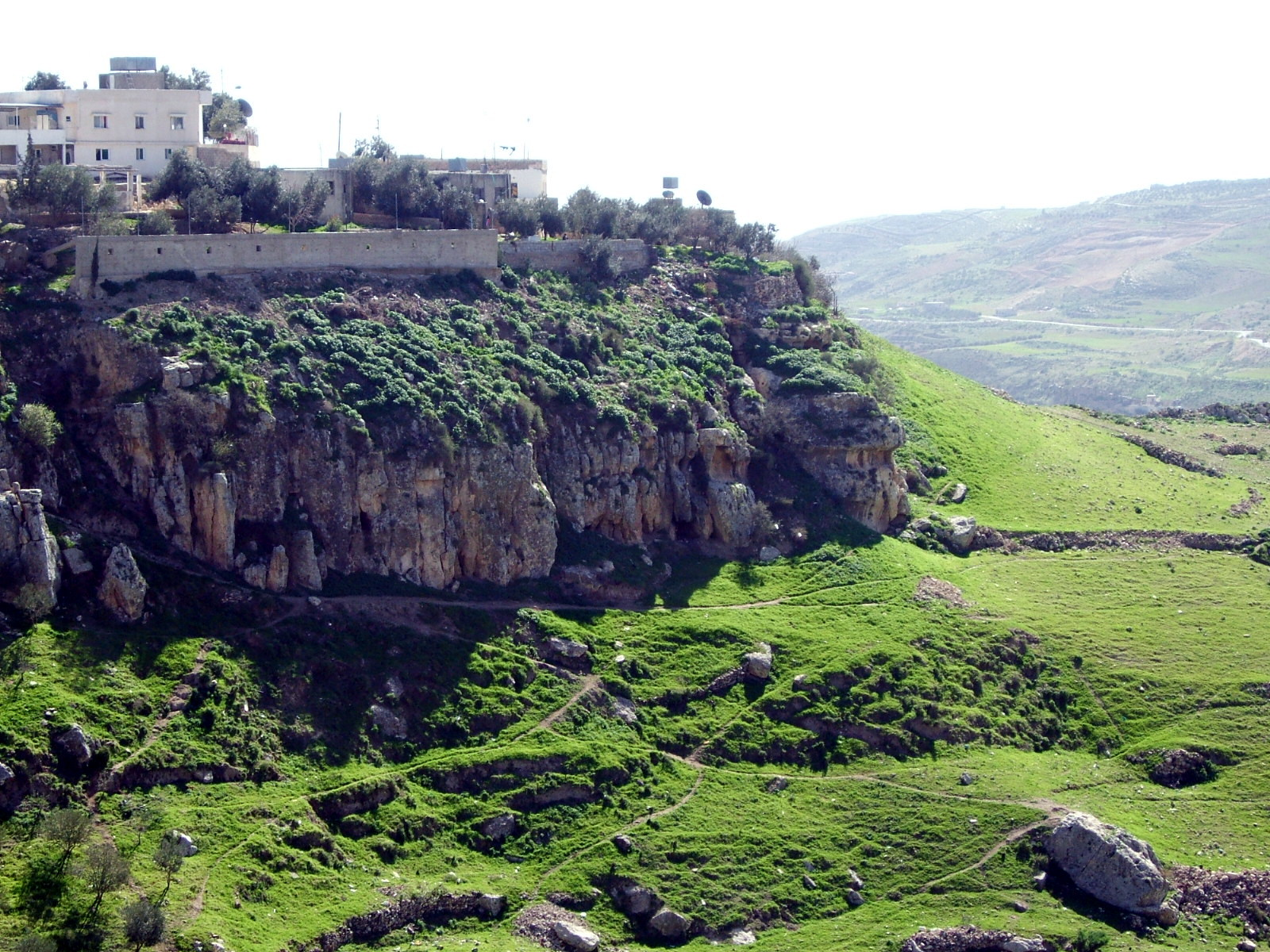
A village near Al-Salt in the Balqa Governorate.

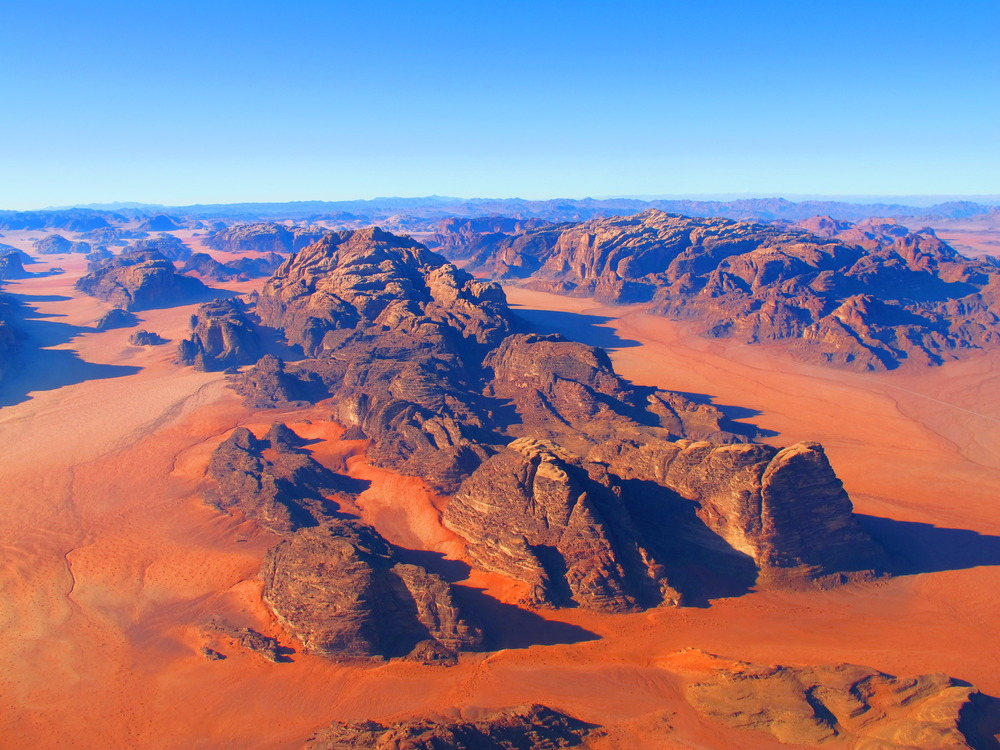
Wadi Rum in Southern Jordan.

The country consists mainly of a plateau between 700 metres (2,300 ft) and 1,200 metres (3,900 ft) meters high, divided into ridges by valleys and gorges, and a few mountainous areas. West of the plateau, land descents form the East Bank of the Jordan Rift Valley. The valley is part of the north–south Great Rift Valley, and its successive depressions are Lake Tiberias (Sea of Galilee; its bottom is about −258 metres (−846 ft)), Jordan Valley, the Dead Sea (its bottom is about −730 metres (−2,400 ft)), Arabah, and the Gulf of Aqaba at the Red Sea. Jordan's western border follows the bottom of the rift. Although an earthquake-prone region, no severe shocks had been recorded for several centuries.

By far the greatest part of the East Bank is desert, displaying the land forms and other features associated with great aridity. Most of this land is part of the Syrian Desert and northern Arabian Desert. There are broad expanses of sand and dunes, particularly in the south and southeast, together with salt flats. Occasional jumbles of sandstone hills or low mountains support only meager and stunted vegetation that thrives for a short period after the scanty winter rains. These areas support little life and are the least populated regions of Jordan.

The drainage network is coarse and incised. In many areas the relief provides no eventual outlet to the sea, so that sedimentary deposits accumulate in basins where moisture evaporates or is absorbed in the ground. Toward the depression in the western part of the East Bank, the desert rises gradually into the Jordanian Highlands—a steppe country of high, deeply cut limestone plateaus with an average elevation of about 900 meters. Occasional summits in this region reach 1,200 meters in the northern part and exceed 1,700 meters in the southern part; the highest peak is Jabal Ramm at 1,754 meters (though the highest peak in all of Jordan is Jabal Umm al Dami at 1854 meters. It is located in a remote part of southern Jordan). These highlands are an area of long-settled villages.

The western edge of this plateau country forms an escarpment along the eastern side of the Jordan River-Dead Sea depression and its continuation south of the Dead Sea. Most of the wadis that provide drainage from the plateau country into the depression carry water only during the short season of winter rains. Sharply incised with deep, canyon-like walls, whether flowing or dry the wadis can be formidable obstacles to travel.

The Jordan River is short, but from its mountain headwaters (approximately 160 kilometers north of the river's mouth at the Dead Sea) the riverbed drops from an elevation of about 3,000 meters above sea level to more than 400 meters below sea level. Before reaching Jordanian territory the river forms the Sea of Galilee, the surface of which is 212 meters below sea level. The Jordan River's principal tributary is the Yarmouk River. Near the junction of the two rivers, the Yarmouk forms the boundary between Israel on the northwest, Syria on the northeast, and Jordan on the south. The Zarqa River, the second main tributary of the Jordan River, flows and empties entirely within the East Bank.

A 380-kilometer-long rift valley runs from the Yarmouk River in the north to Al Aqaba in the south. The northern part, from the Yarmouk River to the Dead Sea, is commonly known as the Jordan Valley. It is divided into eastern and western parts by the Jordan River. Bordered by a steep escarpment on both the eastern and the western side, the valley reaches a maximum width of twenty-two kilometers at some points. The valley is properly known as Al Ghawr or Al Ghor (the depression, or valley).

The Rift Valley on the southern side of the Dead Sea is known as the Southern Ghawr and the Wadi al Jayb (popularly known as the Wadi al Arabah). The Southern Ghawr runs from Wadi al Hammah, on the south side of the Dead Sea, to Ghawr Faya, about twenty-five kilometers south of the Dead Sea. Wadi al Jayb is 180 kilometers long, from the southern shore of the Dead Sea to Al Aqaba in the south. The valley floor varies in level. In the south, it reaches its lowest level at the Dead Sea (more than 400 meters below sea level), rising in the north to just above sea level. Evaporation from the sea is extreme due to year-round high temperatures. The water contains about 250 grams of dissolved salts per liter at the surface and reaches the saturation point at 110 meters.

The Dead Sea occupies the deepest depression on the land surface of the earth. The depth of the depression is accentuated by the surrounding mountains and highlands that rise to elevations of 800 to 1,200 meters above sea level. The sea's greatest depth is about 430 meters, and it thus reaches a point more than 825 meters below sea level. A drop in the level of the sea has caused the former Lisan Peninsula to become a land bridge dividing the sea into separate northern and southern basins.

== Climate ==
A Köppen climate classification map of Jordan.

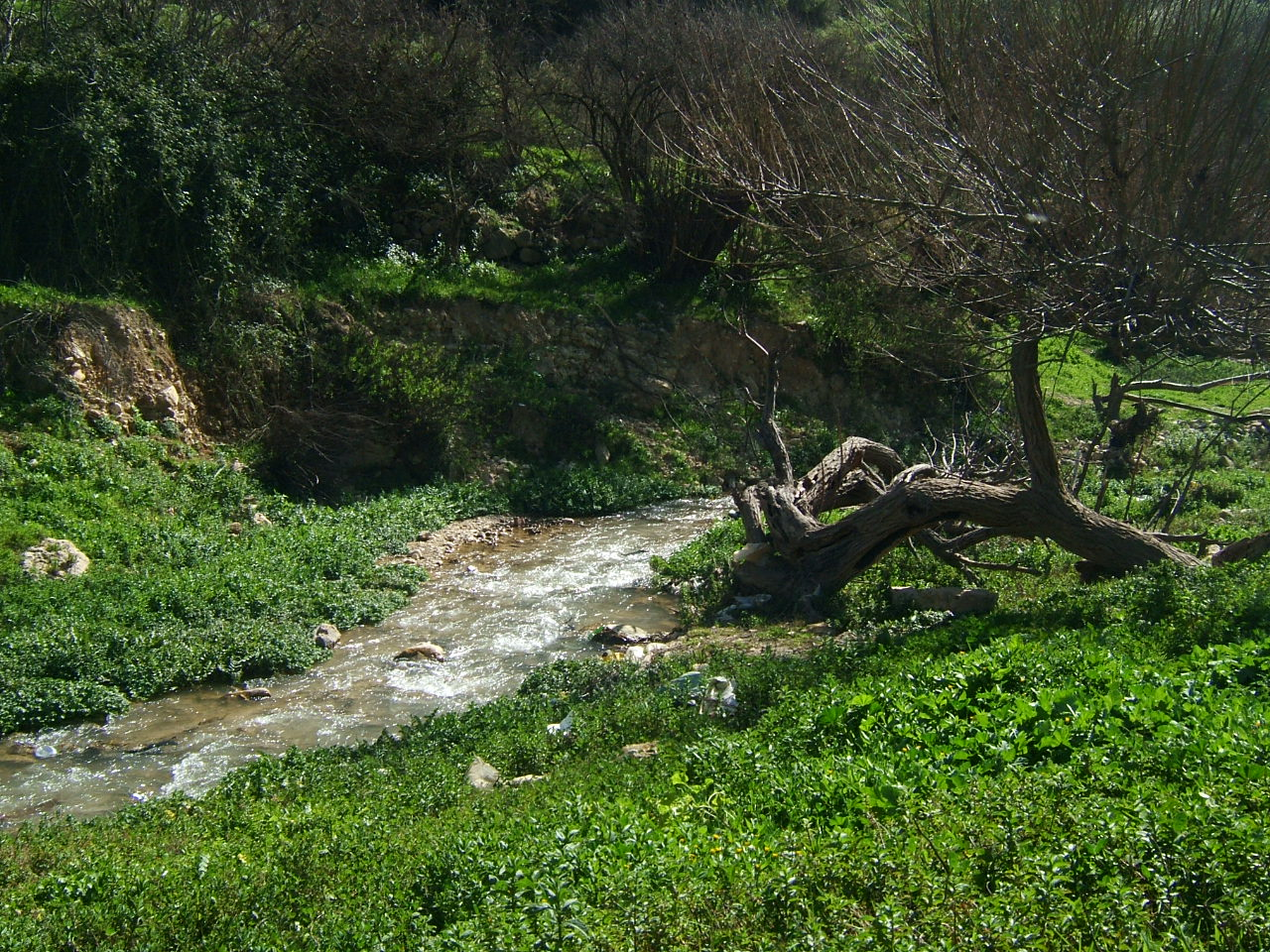
The countryside near Salt.

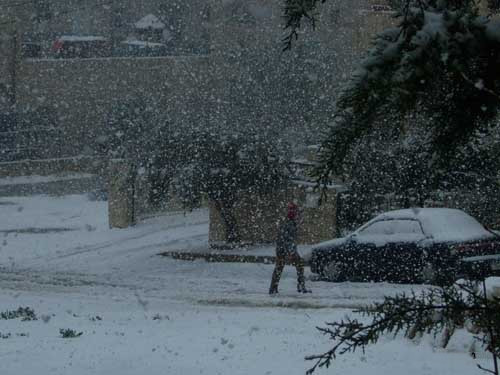
Snow in Amman.

Jordan is the seventeenth most water stressed country in the world.

The major characteristic of the climate is the contrast between a relatively rainy season from November to April and very dry weather for the rest of the year. With hot, dry, uniform summers and cool, variable winters during which practically all of the precipitation occurs, the country has a Mediterranean-style climate.

In general, the farther inland from the Mediterranean Sea a given part of the country lies, the greater are the seasonal contrasts in temperature and the less rainfall. Atmospheric pressures during the summer months are relatively uniform, whereas the winter months bring a succession of marked low pressure areas and accompanying cold fronts. These cyclonic disturbances generally move eastward from over the Mediterranean Sea several times a month and result in sporadic precipitation.

Most of the East Bank receives less than 120 millimeters (4.7 in) of rain a year and may be classified as a dry desert or steppe region. Where the ground rises to form the highlands east of the Jordan Valley, precipitation increases to around 300 millimeters (11.8 in) in the south and 500 millimeters (19.7 in) or more in the north. The Jordan Valley, lying in the lee of high ground on the West Bank, forms a narrow climatic zone that annually receives up to 300 millimeters (11.8 in) of rain in the northern reaches; rain dwindles to less than 120 millimeters (4.7 in) at the head of the Dead Sea.

The country's long summer reaches a peak during August. January is usually the coolest month. The fairly wide ranges of temperature during a twenty-four-hour period are greatest during the summer months and have a tendency to increase with higher elevation and distance from the Mediterranean seacoast. Daytime temperatures during the summer months frequently exceed 36 °C (96.8 °F) and average about 32 °C (89.6 °F). In contrast, the winter months—November to April—bring moderately cool and sometimes cold weather, averaging about 13 °C (55.4 °F). Except in the rift depression, frost is fairly common during the winter, it may take the form of snow at the higher elevations of the north western highlands. Usually it snows a couple of times a year in western Amman.

For a month or so before and after the summer dry season, hot, dry air from the desert, drawn by low pressure, produces strong winds from the south or southeast that sometimes reach gale force. Known in the Middle East by various names, including the khamsin, this dry, sirocco-style wind is usually accompanied by great dust clouds. Its onset is heralded by a hazy sky, a falling barometer and a drop in relative humidity to about 10 percent. Within a few hours there may be a 10 °F (5.6 °C) to 15 °F (8.3 °C) rise in temperature. These windstorms ordinarily last a day or so, cause much discomfort, and destroy crops by desiccating them.

The shamal, another wind of some significance, comes from the north or northwest, generally at intervals between June and September. Remarkably steady during daytime hours but becoming a breeze at night, the shamal may blow for as long as nine days out of ten and then repeat the process. It originates as a dry continental mass of polar air that is warmed as it passes over the Eurasian landmass. The dryness allows intense heating of the Earth's surface by the sun, resulting in high daytime temperatures that moderate after sunset.

Climate data for Amman
Month	Jan	Feb	Mar	Apr	May	Jun	Jul	Aug	Sep	Oct	Nov	Dec	Year
Record high °C (°F)	23.0 (73.4)	27.3 (81.1)	32.6 (90.7)	37.0 (98.6)	38.7 (101.7)	40.6 (105.1)	43.4 (110.1)	43.2 (109.8)	40.0 (104.0)	37.6 (99.7)	31.0 (87.8)	27.5 (81.5)	43.4 (110.1)
Mean daily maximum °C (°F)	12.7 (54.9)	13.9 (57.0)	17.6 (63.7)	23.3 (73.9)	27.9 (82.2)	30.9 (87.6)	32.5 (90.5)	32.7 (90.9)	30.8 (87.4)	26.8 (80.2)	20.1 (68.2)	14.6 (58.3)	23.7 (74.66)
Daily mean °C (°F)	8.5 (47.3)	9.4 (48.9)	12.4 (54.3)	17.1 (62.8)	21.4 (70.5)	24.6 (76.3)	26.5 (79.7)	26.6 (79.9)	24.6 (76.3)	21.0 (69.8)	15.0 (59.0)	10.2 (50.4)	18.1 (64.6)
Mean daily minimum °C (°F)	4.2 (39.6)	4.8 (40.6)	7.2 (45.0)	10.9 (51.6)	14.8 (58.6)	18.3 (64.9)	20.5 (68.9)	20.4 (68.7)	18.3 (64.9)	15.1 (59.2)	9.8 (49.6)	5.8 (42.4)	12.5 (54.5)
Record low °C (°F)	−4.5 (23.9)	−4.4 (24.1)	−3.0 (26.6)	−3.0 (26.6)	3.9 (39.0)	8.9 (48.0)	11.0 (51.8)	11.0 (51.8)	10.0 (50.0)	5.0 (41.0)	0.0 (32.0)	−2.6 (27.3)	−4.5 (23.9)
Average precipitation mm (inches)	60.6 (2.39)	62.8 (2.47)	34.1 (1.34)	7.1 (0.28)	3.2 (0.13)	0.0 (0.0)	0.0 (0.0)	0.0 (0.0)	0.1 (0.00)	7.1 (0.28)	23.7 (0.93)	46.3 (1.82)	245.0 (9.65)
Average precipitation days	11.0	10.9	8.0	4.0	1.6	0.1	0.0	0.0	0.1	2.3	5.3	8.4	51.7
Average relative humidity (%)	71.6	68.4	59.5	49.4	43.4	44.3	46.8	50.9	52.2	52.9	58.5	66.8	55.4
Average dew point °C (°F)	2.9 (37.2)	3.5 (38.3)	4.1 (39.4)	5.1 (41.2)	7.2 (45.0)	10.6 (51.1)	13.4 (56.1)	14.6 (58.3)	13.0 (55.4)	9.6 (49.3)	5.6 (42.1)	3.4 (38.1)	7.8 (46.0)
Mean monthly sunshine hours	179.8	182.0	226.3	266.6	328.6	369.0	387.5	365.8	312.0	275.9	225.0	179.8	3,289.7
Source 1: Jordan Meteorological Department
Source 2: NOAA (sun 1961–1990), Pogoda.ru.net (records), Weather.Directory

Ultraviolet index
Jan	Feb	Mar	Apr	May	Jun	Jul	Aug	Sep	Oct	Nov	Dec	Year
3	5	7	9	10	12	12	11	9	6	4	3	7.5

== Resources and land use ==
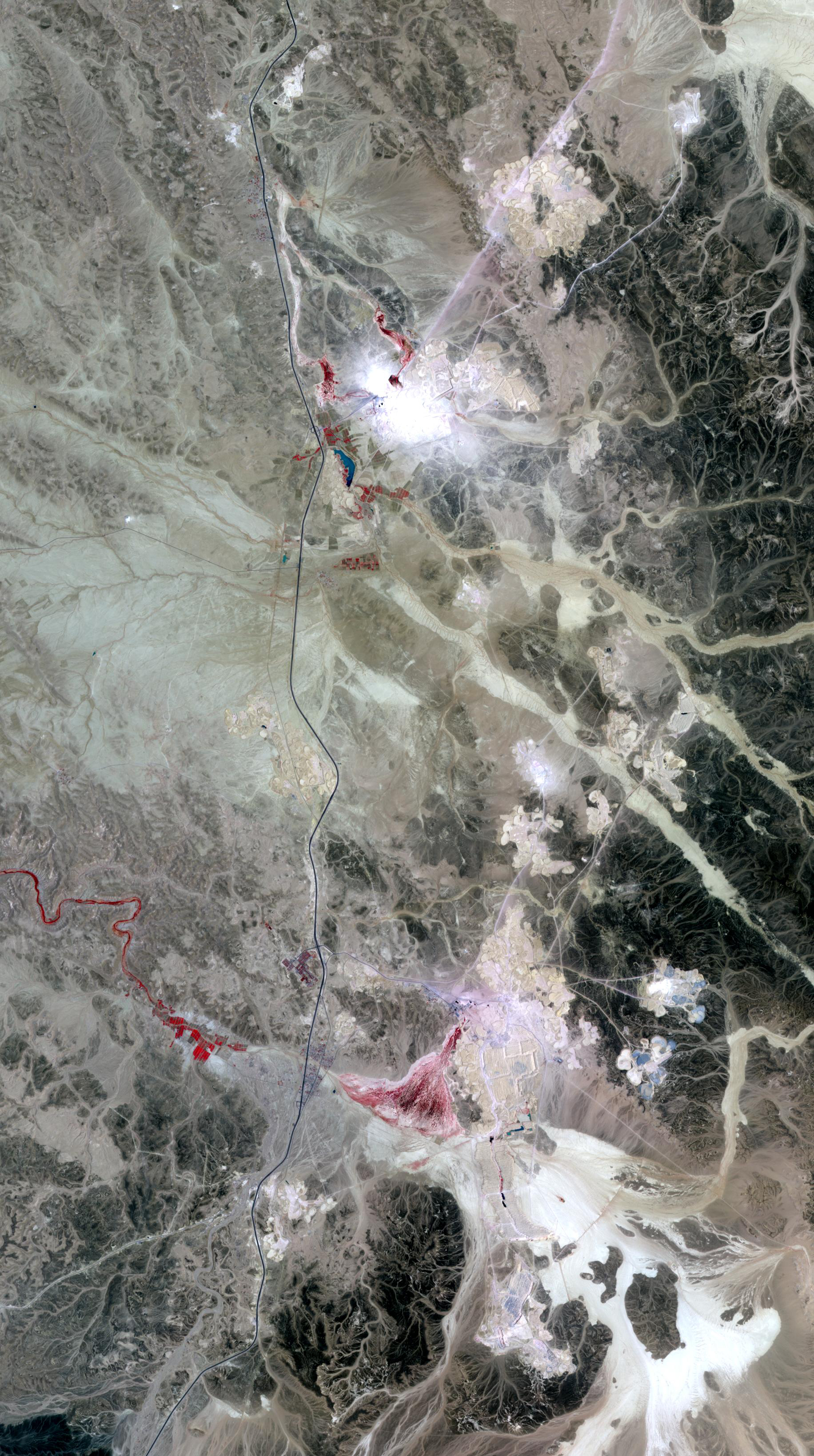
Phosphate mines in Jordan, east of the southerly Dead Sea

Natural resources: phosphates, potash, oil shale

Land use:

- arable land: 2.41%
- permanent crops: 0.97%
- other: 96.62% (2012)

Irrigated land:

- 788.6 square kilometres (304.5 sq mi) (2004)

Total renewable water resources:

- 0.94 cubic kilometres (0.23 cu mi) (2011)

Freshwater withdrawal (domestic/industrial/agricultural):

- total: 0.94 cubic kilometres (0.23 cu mi)/yr (31%/4%/65%)
- per capita: 166 cubic metres (5,900 cu ft)/yr (2005)

== Environmental concerns ==
Droughts; occasional minor earthquakes in areas close to the Jordan Rift Valley

Environment – current issues: limited natural fresh water resources and water stress; deforestation; overgrazing; soil erosion; desertification

Environment – international agreements:
party to: Biodiversity, Climate Change, Climate Change-Kyoto Protocol, Desertification, Endangered Species, Hazardous Wastes, Law of the Sea, Marine Dumping, Ozone Layer Protection, Wetlands

== See also ==
- Borders of Jordan
- Midian
- Winston's Hiccup
