= Wadi Rum =

Valley in southern Jordan

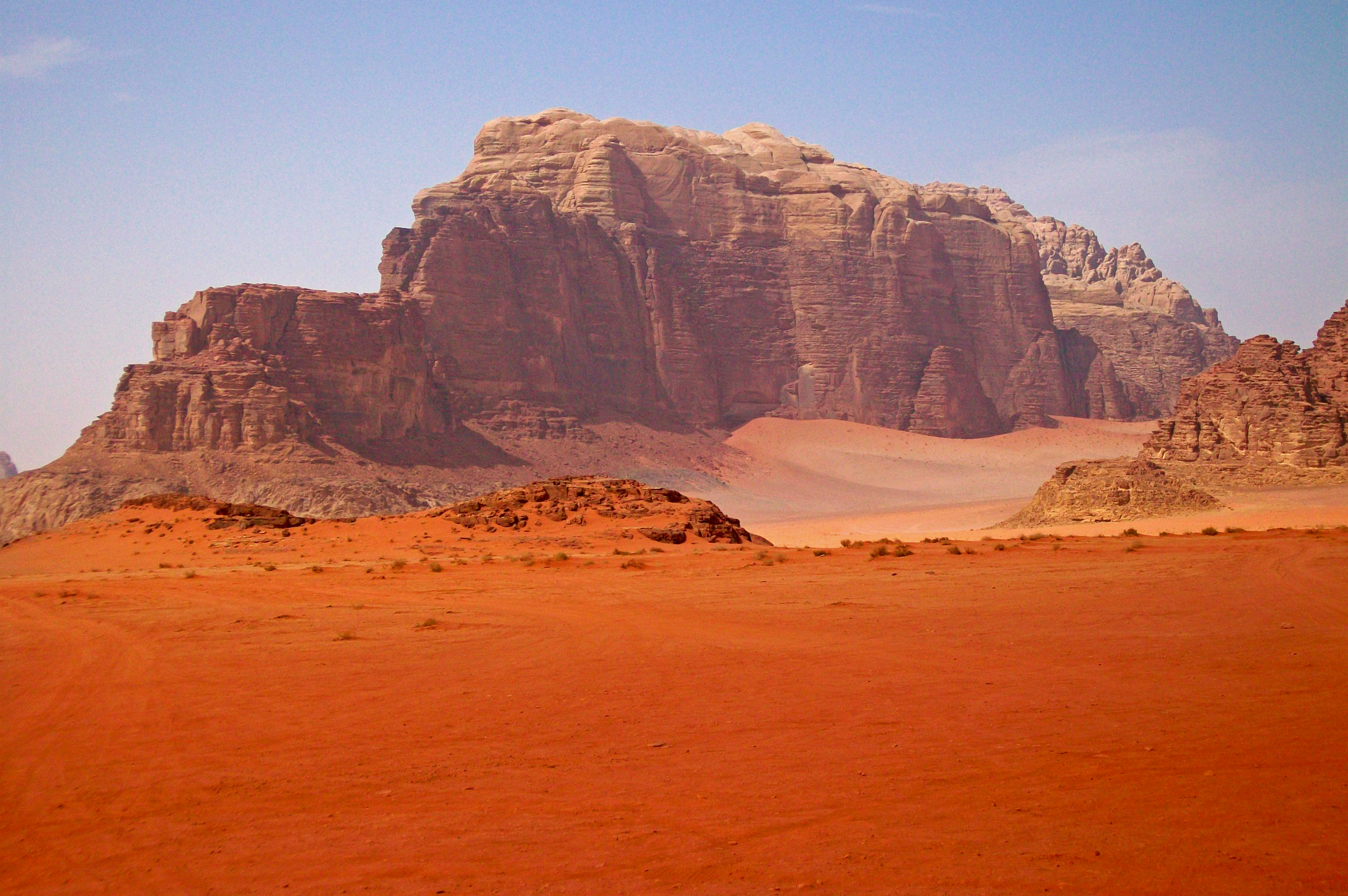
- A Wadi Rum vista
- Interactive map of Wadi Rum
- Location: Aqaba, Jordan
- Coordinates: 29°35′35″N 35°25′12″E
- Area: 721 km^{2} (278 sq mi)
- Elevation: 45–1,750 m (148–5,741 ft)
- Named for: Arabic for "Valley of (light, airborne) sand"
- Operator: Aqaba Special Economic Zone Authority
- Website: Wadi Rum

UNESCO World Heritage Site
- Official name: Wadi Rum Protected Area
- Type: Mixed
- Criteria: iii, v, vii
- Designated: 2011
- Reference no.: 1377
- Region: Arab States

Wadi Rum (Arabic: وادي رم Wādī Ramm, also Wādī al-Ramm, known also as the Valley of the Moon or Red mountains (Arabic: وادي القمر, romanized: Wādī al-Qamar), is a valley cut into the sandstone and granite rock in southern Jordan, near the border with Saudi Arabia and about 60 km (37 mi) to the east of the city of Aqaba. With an area of 720 km^{2} (280 mi^{2}) it is the largest wadi (river valley) in Jordan.

Several prehistoric civilizations left petroglyphs, rock inscriptions and ruins in Wadi Rum. Today it is a tourist attraction, offering guided tours, hiking and rock climbing. The Wadi Rum Protected Area has been a UNESCO World Heritage site since 2011.

== Toponym ==
Wadi Rum or Wadi Ramm is believed to get its name from the early name of Iram of the Pillars (also called Irum (Arabic: إرم), a lost city mentioned in the Quran.

== Geography ==
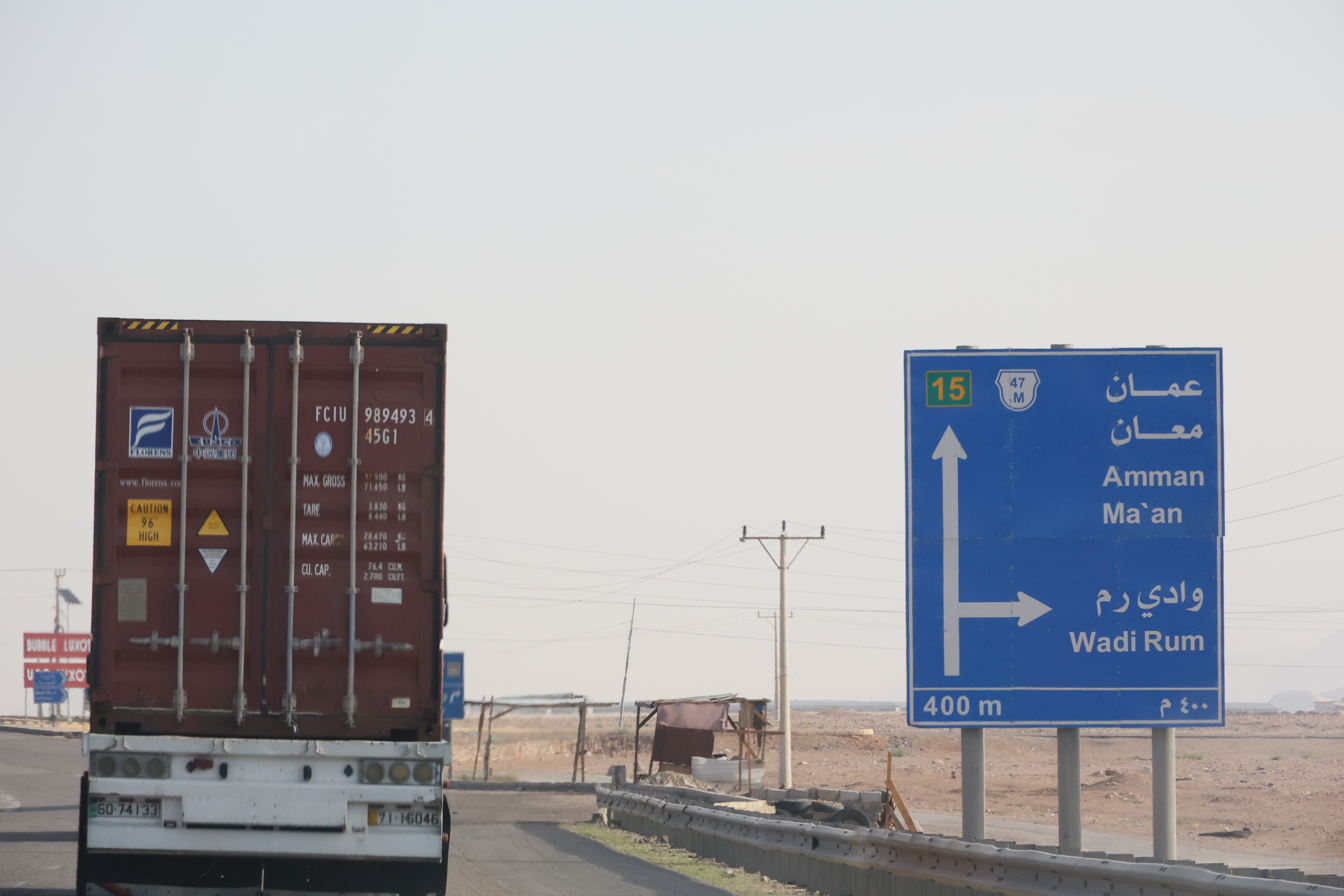
Landscape view of Wadi Rum desert, Jordan.

The area is centered on the main valley of Wadi Rum. The highest elevation in Jordan is Jabal Umm ad Dami at 1,840 m (6,040 ft) high (SRTM data states 1854 m), located 30 km (19 mi) south of Wadi Rum village. It was first located by Difallah Ateeg, a Zalabia Bedouin from Rum. On a clear day, it is possible to see the Red Sea and the Saudi border from the top.

Jabal Ram or Jebel Rum (1,734 m (5,689 ft) above sea level) is the second highest peak in Jordan and the highest peak in the central Rum, rising directly above Rum valley, opposite Jebel um Ishrin, which is possibly one metre lower.

Khaz'ali Canyon in Wadi Rum is the site of petroglyphs etched into the cave walls depicting humans and antelopes dating back to the Thamudic times. The village of Wadi Rum itself consists of several hundred Bedouin inhabitants with their goat-hair tents and concrete houses and also their four-wheel vehicles, one school for boys and one for girls, a few shops, and the headquarters of the Desert Patrol.

== Climate ==
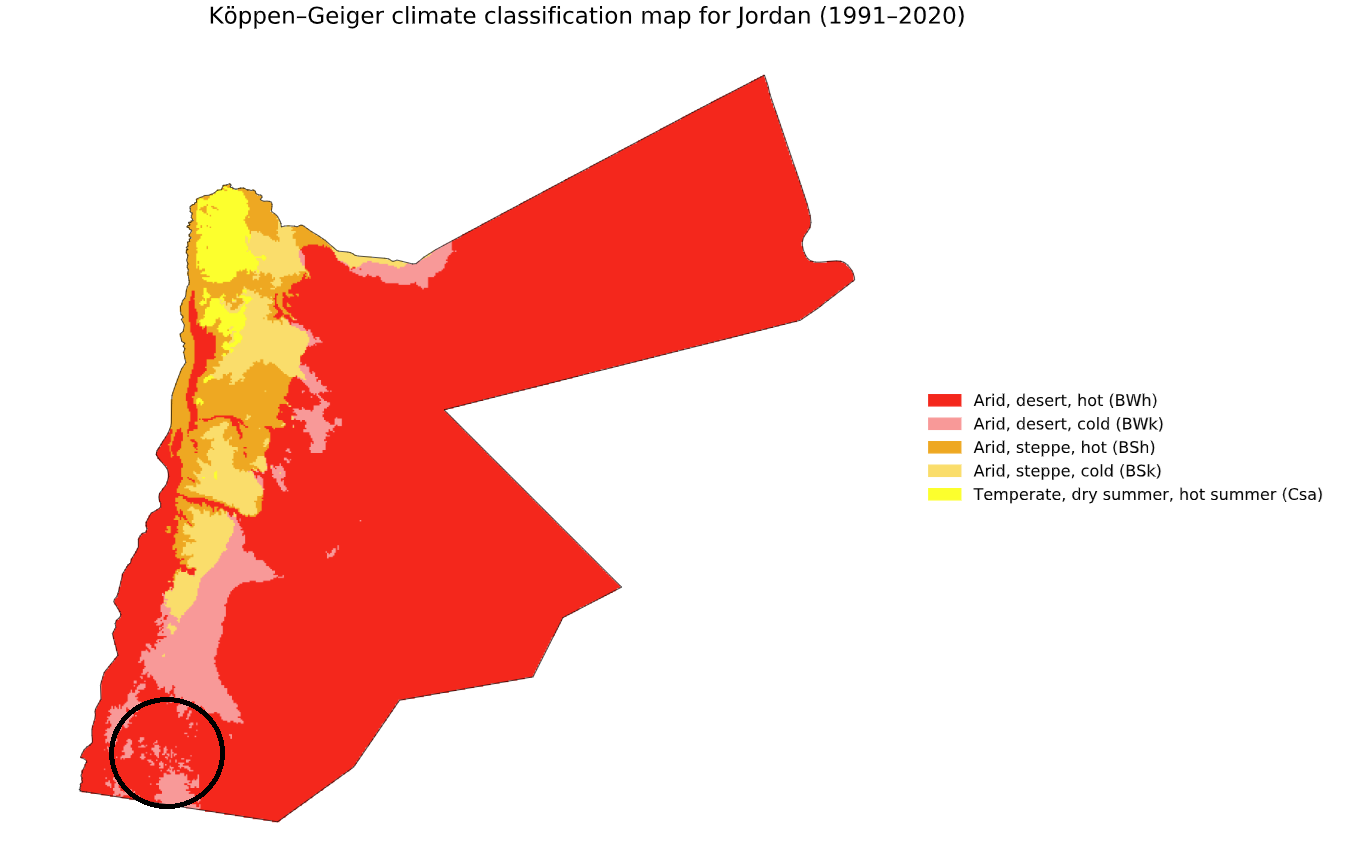
Köppen climate classification of Jordan, where Wadi Rum is in southwest corner inside the black circle.

Wadi Rum experiences a desert climate (Köppen: BWh/BWk). Rainfall is scarce, often occurring as flash floods, and results almost exclusively from thunderstorms. These thunderstorms are caused when cold upper air pools passing through the Eastern Mediterranean interact with the Red Sea thermal low, combined with the presence of subtropical moisture in the mid and high levels of the atmosphere.

Climate data for Wadi Rum, elevation 952 m (3,123 ft), (1971–2000)
Month	Jan	Feb	Mar	Apr	May	Jun	Jul	Aug	Sep	Oct	Nov	Dec	Year
Mean daily maximum °C (°F)	14.6 (58.3)	17.7 (63.9)	21.1 (70.0)	25.1 (77.2)	29.9 (85.8)	32.9 (91.2)	34.6 (94.3)	34.3 (93.7)	32.9 (91.2)	28.6 (83.5)	21.1 (70.0)	16.1 (61.0)	25.7 (78.3)
Mean daily minimum °C (°F)	4.6 (40.3)	5.9 (42.6)	9.0 (48.2)	11.8 (53.2)	15.0 (59.0)	17.2 (63.0)	19.3 (66.7)	18.7 (65.7)	17.0 (62.6)	13.4 (56.1)	9.2 (48.6)	5.1 (41.2)	12.2 (53.9)
Average precipitation mm (inches)	19 (0.7)	10 (0.4)	18 (0.7)	7 (0.3)	3 (0.1)	0 (0)	0 (0)	0 (0)	0 (0)	2 (0.1)	6 (0.2)	9 (0.4)	74 (2.9)
Source: FAO

== Geology ==
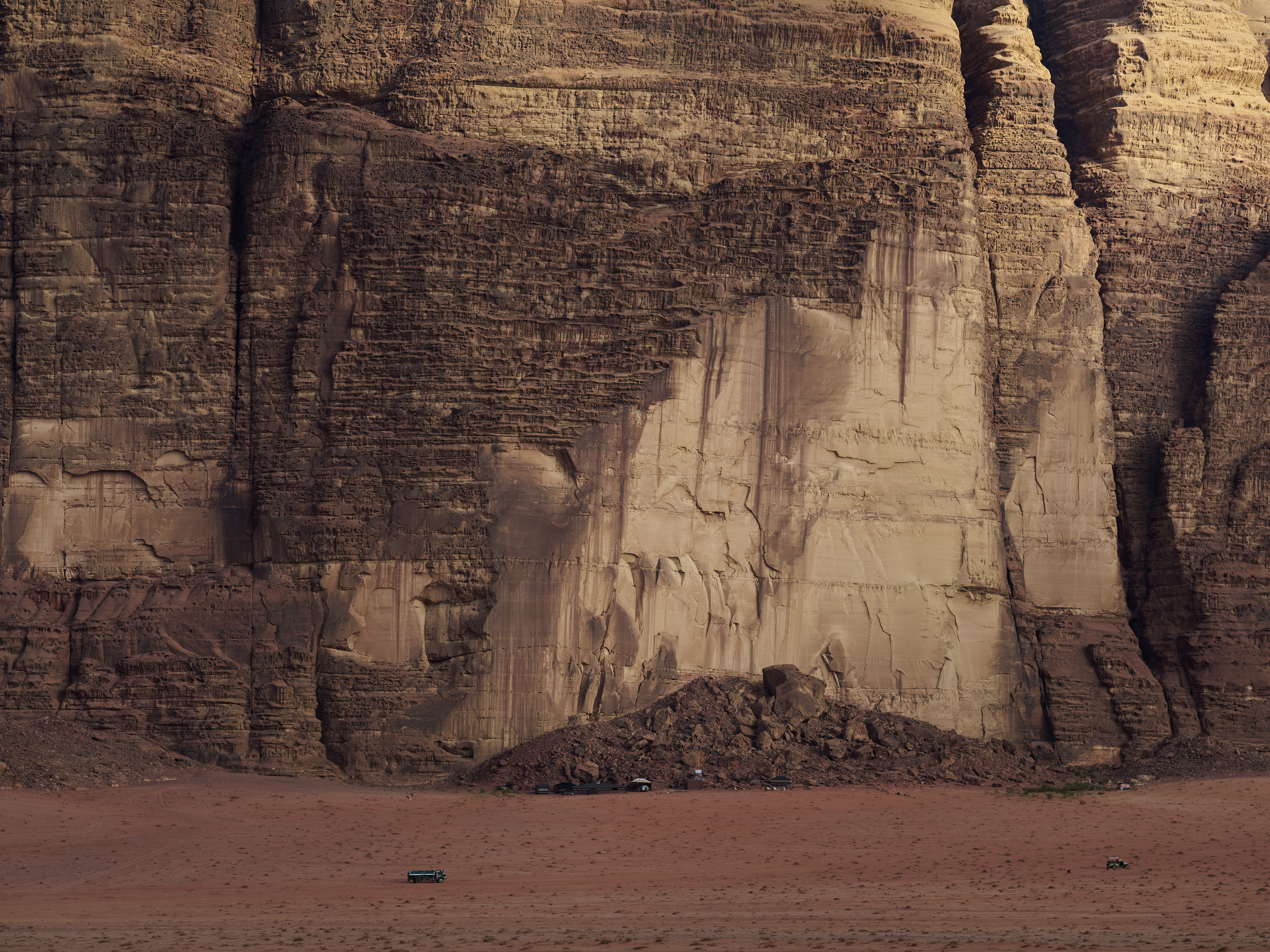
A large vertical rock formation at Wadi Rum.

Wadi Rum is located within the Sandstone Mountain and Valley Region of southern Jordan the area is characterized by tall, near vertical mountains of iron-rich, erosion resistant, Umm Ishrin Sandstone, separated by flat-bottom valleys of alluvial sediments, aeolian sands, and salt pans. The Umm Ishrin is the thickest formation in the Lower Palaeozoic-Upper Cretaceous Nubian Sandstone, underlying the Disi and Umm Sahn sandstone formations, and overlying the Salib Arkosic Formation. The Salib in turn overlies the eroded Aqaba Complex of plutonic granitoids. An aquifer forms along this lithologic contact, with springs forming on the eastern mountain slopes. Alluvial fans compose most of the alluvial sediments. Aeolian systems include tafoni, natural bridges, and sand dunes. Sand dunes include barkhans, climbing dunes consisting of sand ramps that reach the tops of hills, and echo dunes consisting of sands that have crawled over a hill to be deposited on the lee side.

== History ==
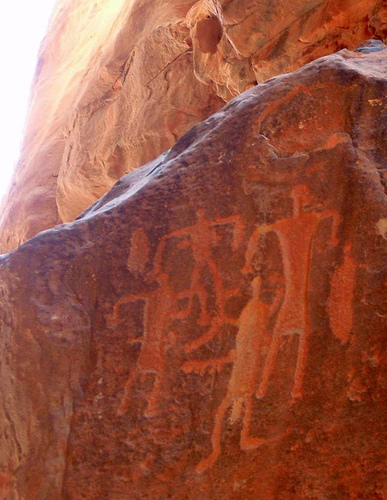
Petroglyphs at Wadi Rum

Various human cultures have inhabited Wadi Rum since prehistoric times, with many cultures–including the Nabataeans–leaving their mark in the form of petroglyphs, inscriptions, and temple ruins.

According to Bienkowski, the area was part of the Kingdom of Edom (between the 13th and 6th centuries BCE). The region contains numerous archaeological remains, including copper mining sites at Wadi Feynan and ancient fortifications. Trade routes connecting Arabia to the Levant passed through the area, contributing to its prosperity.

Currently, the majority is made up by the Zalabieh Bedouins who arrived to the region around 1980. The word "Bedouin" comes from the Arabic word for desert, pronounced badiya in the Arabic language. The root of this word is bad’a, which translates to "clear" and "obvious" in Arabic. One central characteristic for Bedouin tribes is the sense of belonging that tribe members feel.

When they first arrived, the Zalabieh bedouins lived in tents. Their village held about 700–800 people. 80% of those people were either retired from the army or the police.

The camel is the favorite animal of the Zalabieh bedouins. It is a symbol for male pride. Camel racing is an important sport for the Bedouins. These races allow Bedouins to engage in male competition, and establish manhood and power within the community.

Wadi Rum was documented by British officer T. E. Lawrence, who passed through several times during the Arab Revolt of 1917–18. In the 1980s one of the rock formations in Wadi Rum, originally known as "Jabal al-Mazmar" (The Mountain of (the) Plague), was named "The Seven Pillars of Wisdom," after Lawrence's book penned in the aftermath of the war, though the 'Seven Pillars' referred to in the book have no connection with Rum.

Lawrence described his entrance into the Valley of Rumm: "The hills on the right grew taller and sharper, a fair counterpart of the other side which straightened itself to one massive rampart of redness. They drew together until only two miles divided them: and then, towering gradually till their parallel parapets must have been a thousand feet above us, ran forward in an avenue for miles. The crags were capped in nests of domes, less hotly red than the body of the hill; rather grey and shallow. They gave the finishing semblance of Byzantine architecture to this irresistible place: this processional way greater than imagination."

Lawrence also described his encounter with the spring, Ain Shalaaleh, "On the rock-bulge above were clear-cut Nabathaean inscriptions, and a sunk panel incised with a monogram or symbol. Around and about were Arab scratches, including tribe-marks, some of which were witnesses of forgotten migrations: but my attention was only for the splashing of water in a crevice under the shadow of the overhanging rock. I looked in to see the spout, a little thinner than my wrist, jetting out firmly from a fissure in the roof, and falling with that clean sound into a shallow, frothing pool, behind the step which served as an entrance. Thick ferns and grasses of the finest green made it a paradise just five feet square."

The discovery of the Nabataean Temple (located walking distance from the Rest House) in 1933 briefly returned the spotlight to the desert. A French team of archaeologists completed the excavations in 1997.

In April 2025, in a landmark archaeological discovery, the Jordanian Ministry of Tourism and Antiquities announced the finding of the first royal hieroglyphic inscription in Wadi Rum. The inscription features two royal cartouches of King Ramesses III, one of the greatest warrior kings of Egypt, displaying his birth and throne names. During the official press conference, the Jordanian scientific team emphasized that this discovery provides tangible evidence of a military or commercial campaign. The team noted that the presence of such a royal mark indicates that Ramesses III was involved in this mission, either directly or indirectly, highlighting Wadi Rum’s historical role as a vital corridor connecting Ancient Egypt with the Southern Levant and the Arabian Peninsula.

== Activities ==
=== Tourism ===
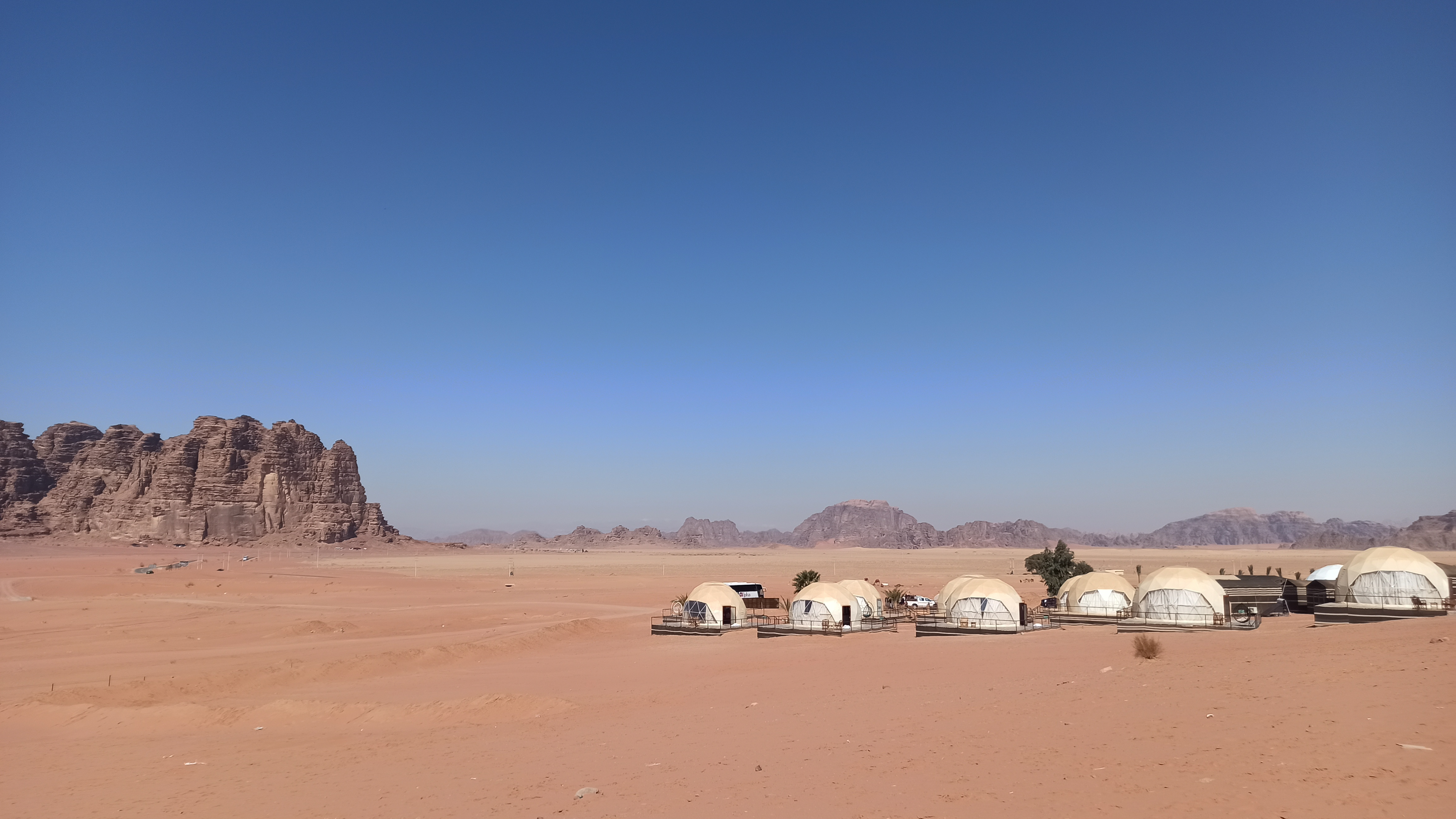
Desert camp for tourists in Wadi Rum

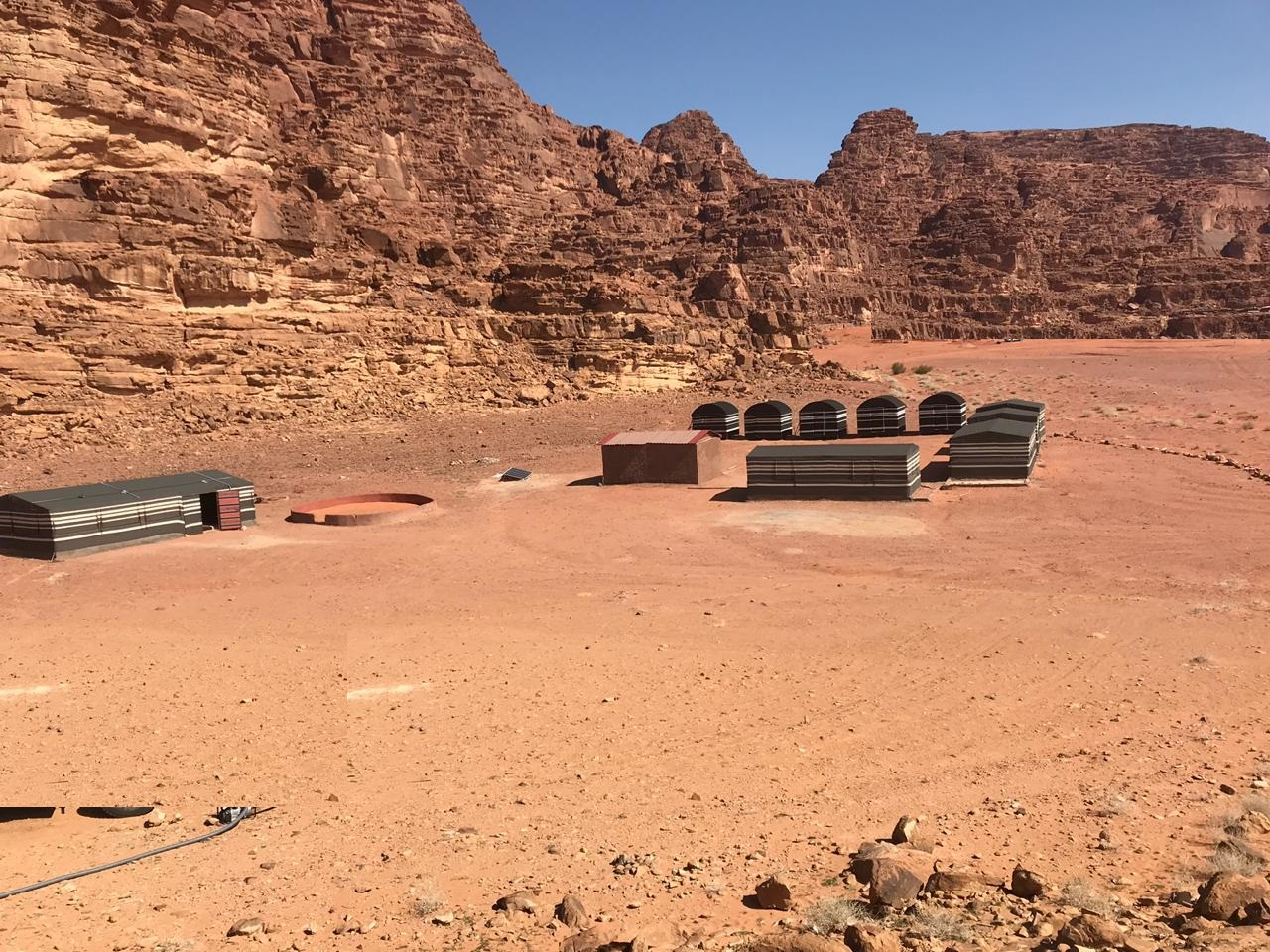
Secluded traditional Bedouin camp protected by mountains

Desert scenes of Wadi Rum in Lawrence of Arabia from 1962 kick-started Jordan's tourism industry.

Wadi Rum is one of Jordan's most popular tourist sites, attracting 162,000 tourists in 2017. Wadi Rum is home to the Zalabieh tribe, who developed eco-adventure tourism and services throughout the protected area. Using local guides and services brings many benefits to the protected area. In particular, it enables people to continue earning a living from the land and helps to ensure that the protected area remains protected.

Bedouins in Wadi Rum allow tourists to stay overnight in their traditional camps, and provide activities, meals and transport throughout the desert. They also run restaurants and small shops in the villages that provide meals and basic supplies for visitors. Popular activities in Wadi Rum include 4x4 tours, camel rides, hiking, and camping.

Dima and Lama Hattab coordinate an annual marathon in the region called Jabal Ishrin.

=== Rock climbing ===
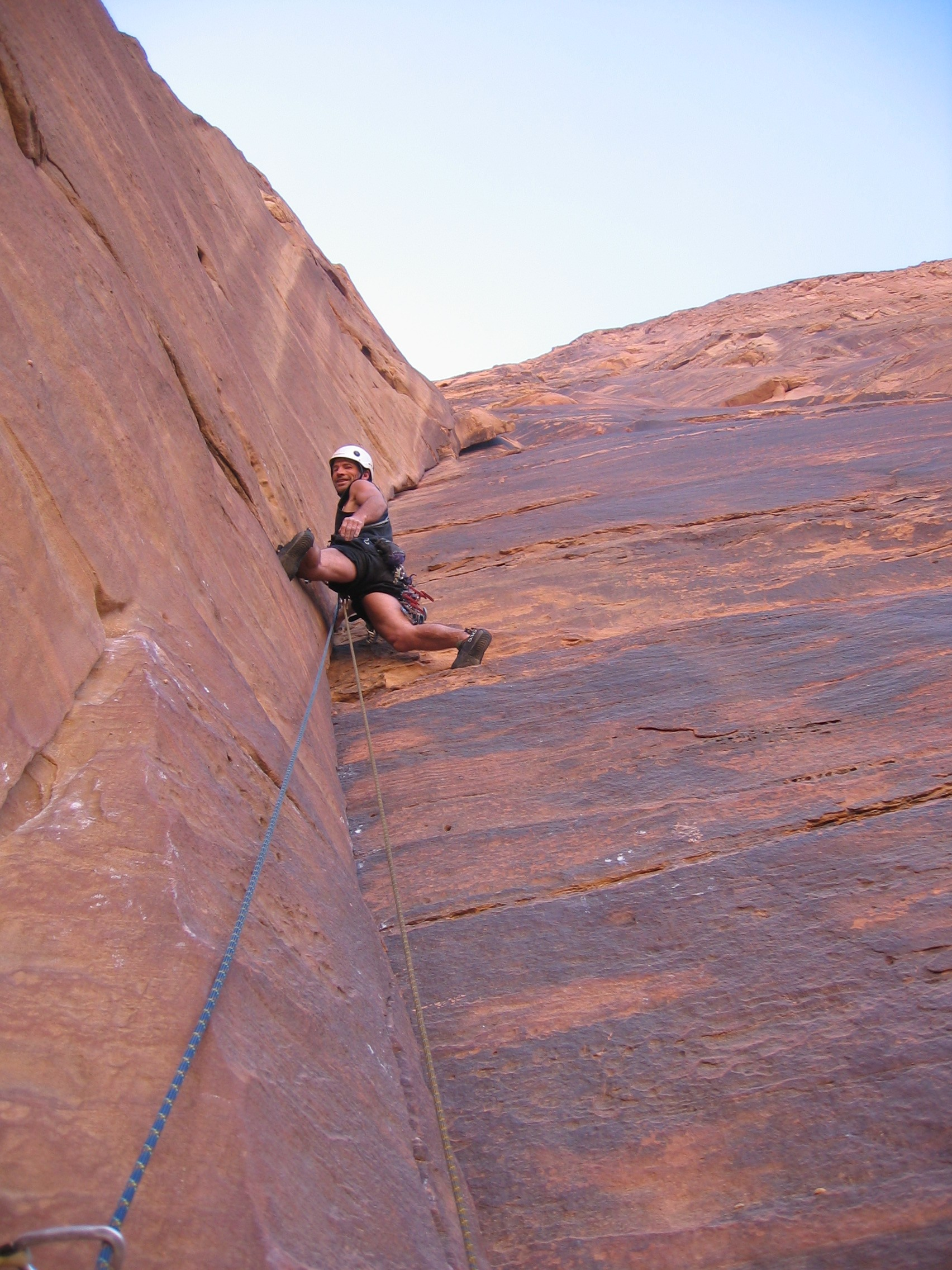
Climber on Jabal Ram

Local Bedouin have climbed in the sandstone mountains of Wadi Rum for many generations. Many of their 'Bedouin Roads' have been rediscovered and documented by modern climbers. Several are included in the climbing guidebook by Tony Howard, and online by Liên and Gilles Rappeneau.

In 1949, Sheikh Hamdan took surveyors to the summit of Jabal Ram. The first recorded European ascent of Jabal Rum took place in November 1952, by Charmian Longstaff and Sylvia Branford, guided by Sheik Hamdan. The first recorded rock climbs started in 1984, with the first of many visits by English climbers Howard, Baker, Taylor and Shaw. This group repeated many of the Bedouin routes, accompanied by locals and independently, including, in 1984, Hammad's Route on Jebel Rum, and, in 1985, Sheikh Kraim's Hunter's Slabs and Rijm Assaf on Jebel Rum. Many new routes were climbed in the 1980s, by this team, French guide Wilfried Colonna, by the Swiss Remy brothers, and by Haupolter and Precht. The first dedicated climbing guide book, Treks and Climb in Wadi Rum, by Tony Howard, was first published in 1987. Some of the many Bedouin routes have been documented online by Lien and Gilles Rappeneau. A new routes book for climbers is held at the Wadi Rum Guest House.

The route Guerre Sainte was climbed in 2000 by Batoux, Petit and friends. This was the first route in Wadi Rum to be entirely equipped using bolt protection. The route, on the East Face of Jebel Nassarani North, is 450 m (1,480 ft) long, and graded F7b or F7aA0.

=== Filming location ===
The area has been used as a background setting in a number of films. Filmmakers are particularly drawn to it for science fiction films set on Mars.

The Location Managers Guild recognized the Jordanian Royal Film Commission with its LMGI Award for Outstanding Film Commission in 2017 for its work on Rogue One, which was filmed at Wadi Rum. The RFC was previously nominated for its work with The Martian.

- Lawrence of Arabia – David Lean filmed much of this 1962 film on location in Wadi Rum.
- Prometheus – scenes for the Alien Planet
- The Last Days on Mars – filmed for exterior shots representing the surface of the titular planet for this 2013 film.
- The Martian – filming for the Ridley Scott film began in March 2015, for shots that stood in for the surface of Mars.
- Theeb – Filmed mostly in Wadi Rum, as well as Wadi Araba.
- Rogue One: A Star Wars Story, used for scenes set on Jedha.
- Aladdin, 2019 live action remake of the 1992 Disney animated film of the same name.
- Star Wars: The Rise of Skywalker, used for the desert planet Pasaana.
- Dune (2021), used as a location for the desert planet Arrakis. Timothée Chalamet called Wadi Rum 'awe-inspiring'.
- Dune: Part Two, used as a filming location.
- Aadujeevitham – The desert scenes of the 2024 Malayalam film were mostly shot on locations in Wadi Rum.
- Moon Knight (2022), used for the scenes outside Ammit's tomb.
- The Amazing Race 34
- John Wick: Chapter 4 (2023), used for a desert scene while John Wick is on the move.
- Special Forces: World's Toughest Test season 1
- Bade Miyan Chote Miyan (2024)

== Gallery ==
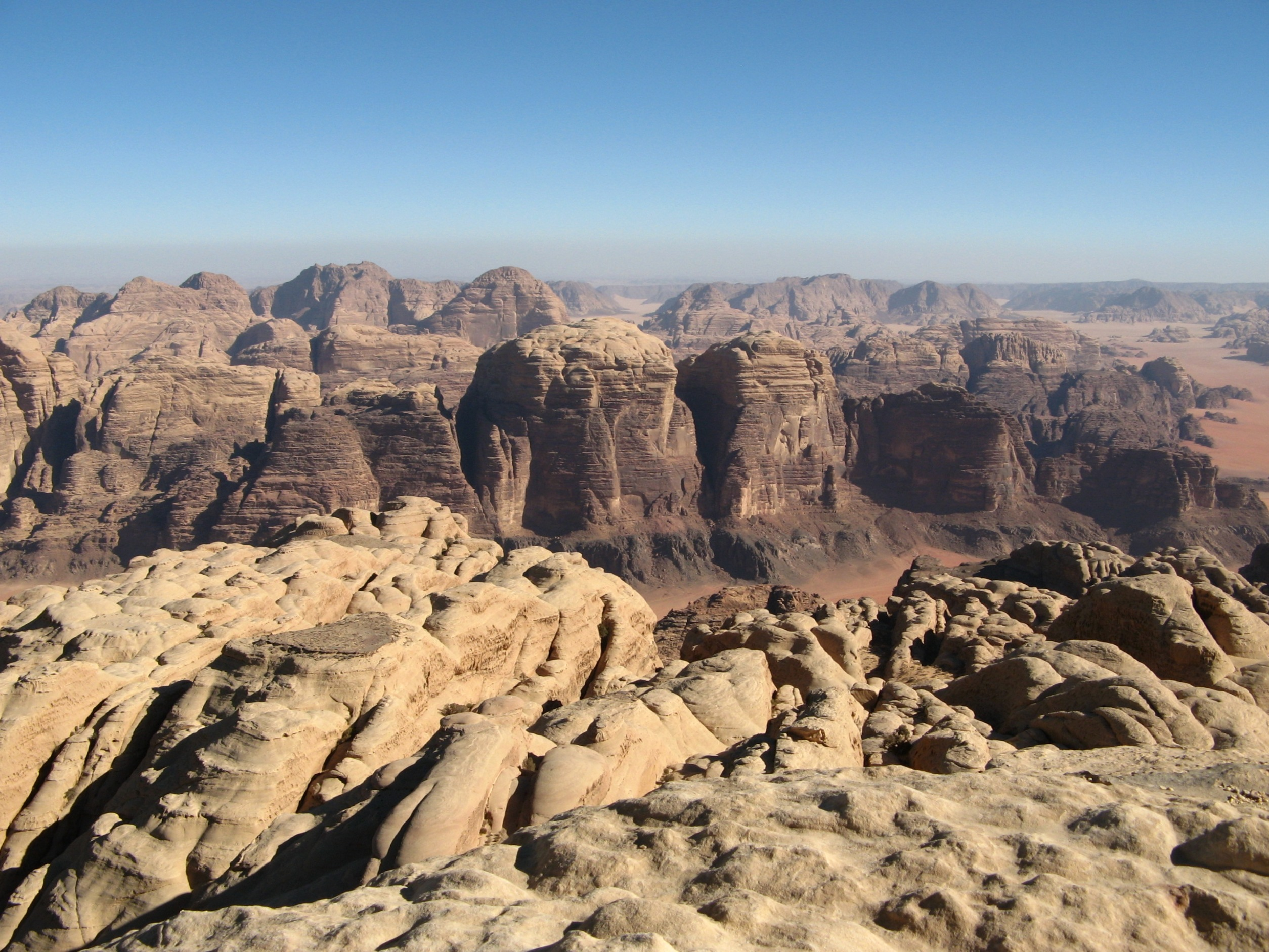
View from the top of Jabal Ram

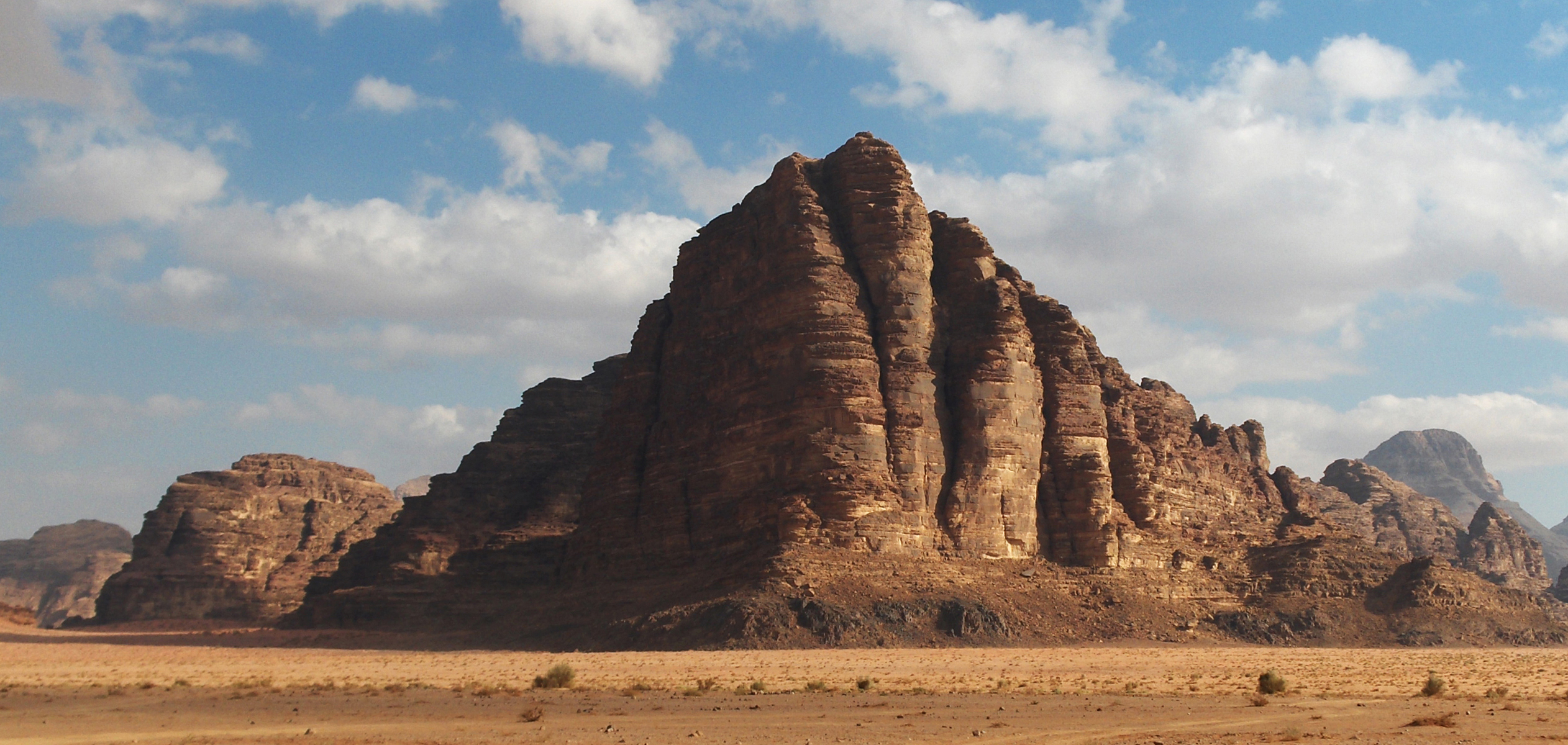
The "Seven Pillars of Wisdom" rock formation

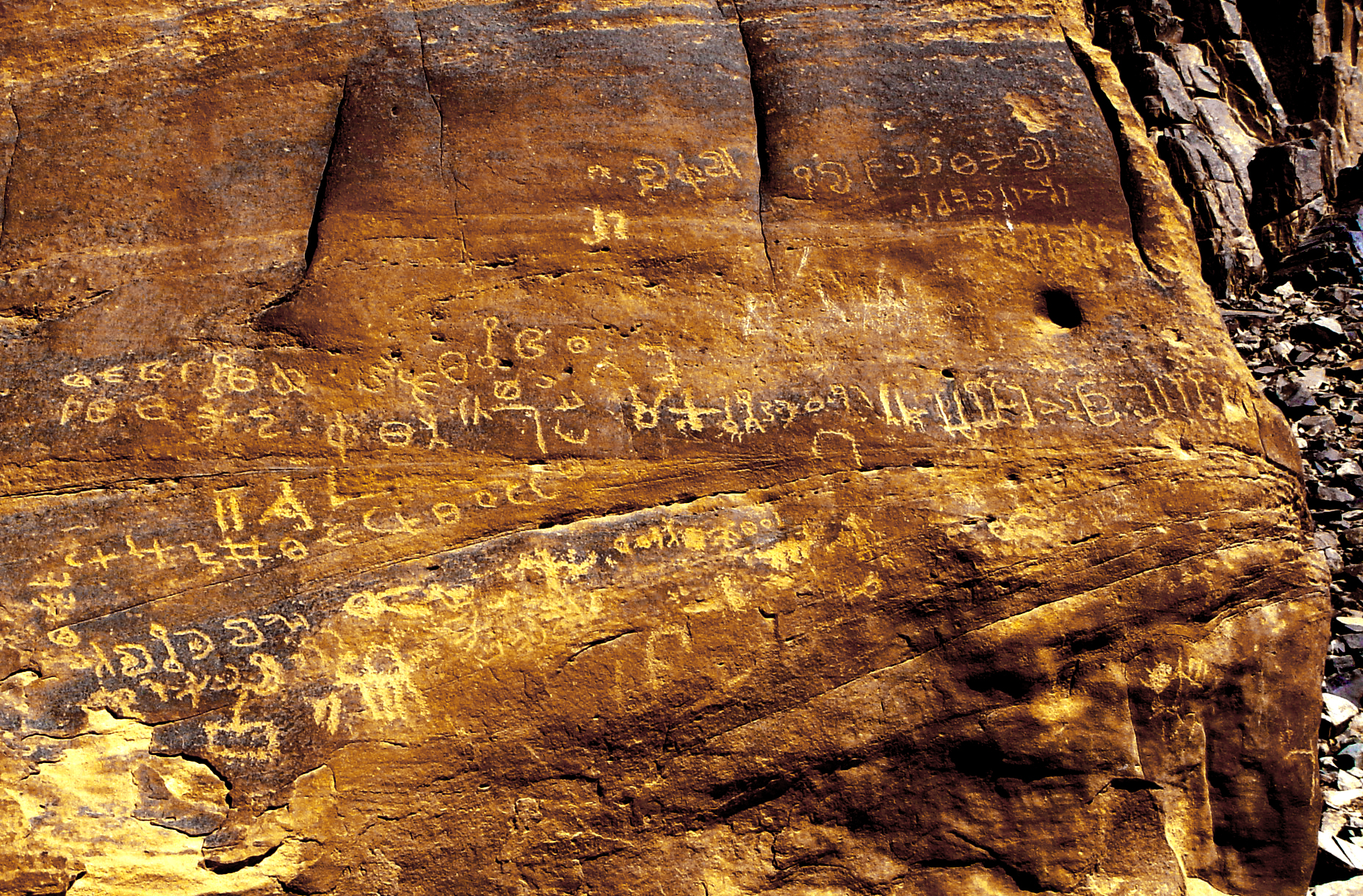
Thamudic inscriptions in Wadi Rum

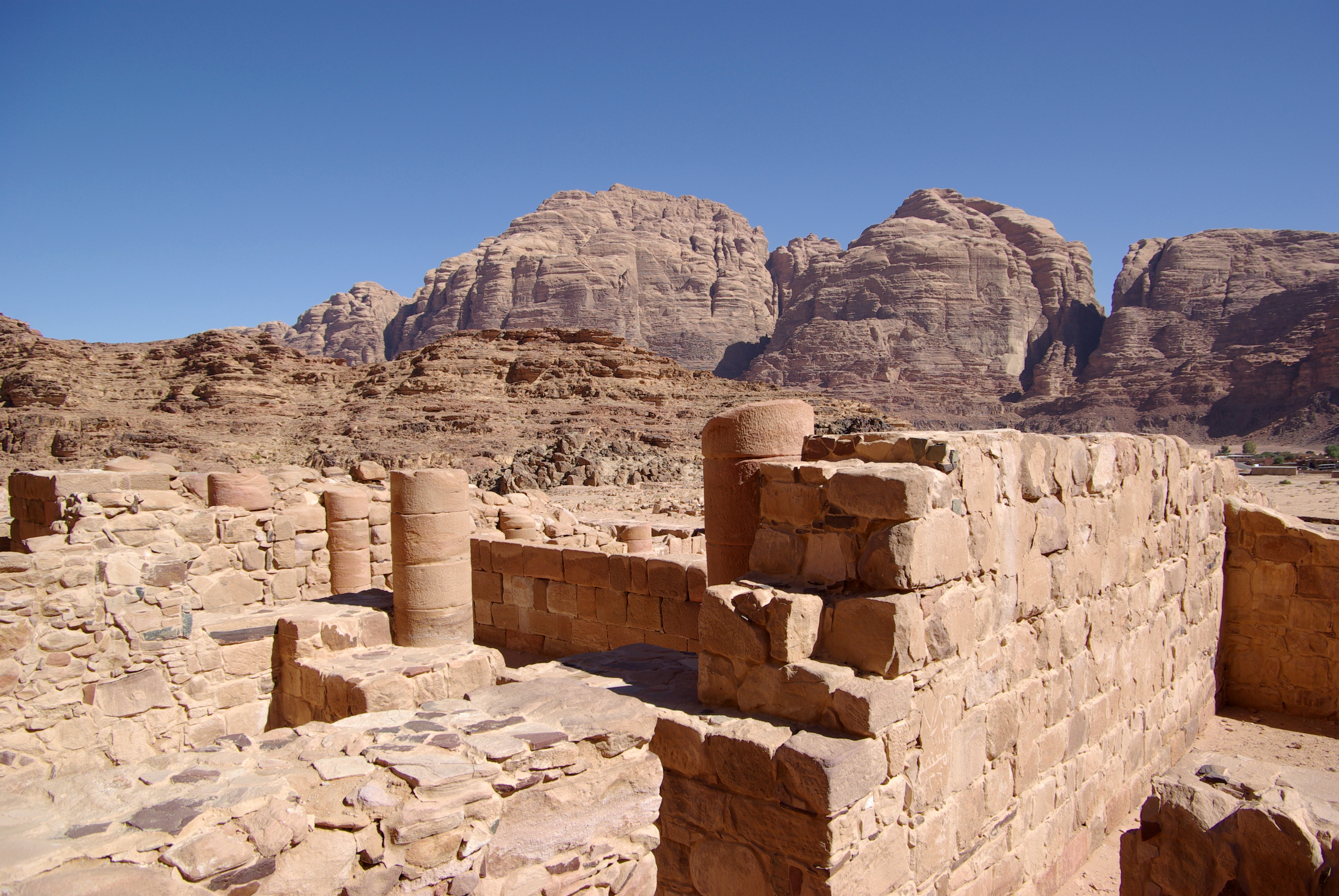
A Nabatean temple in Wadi Rum

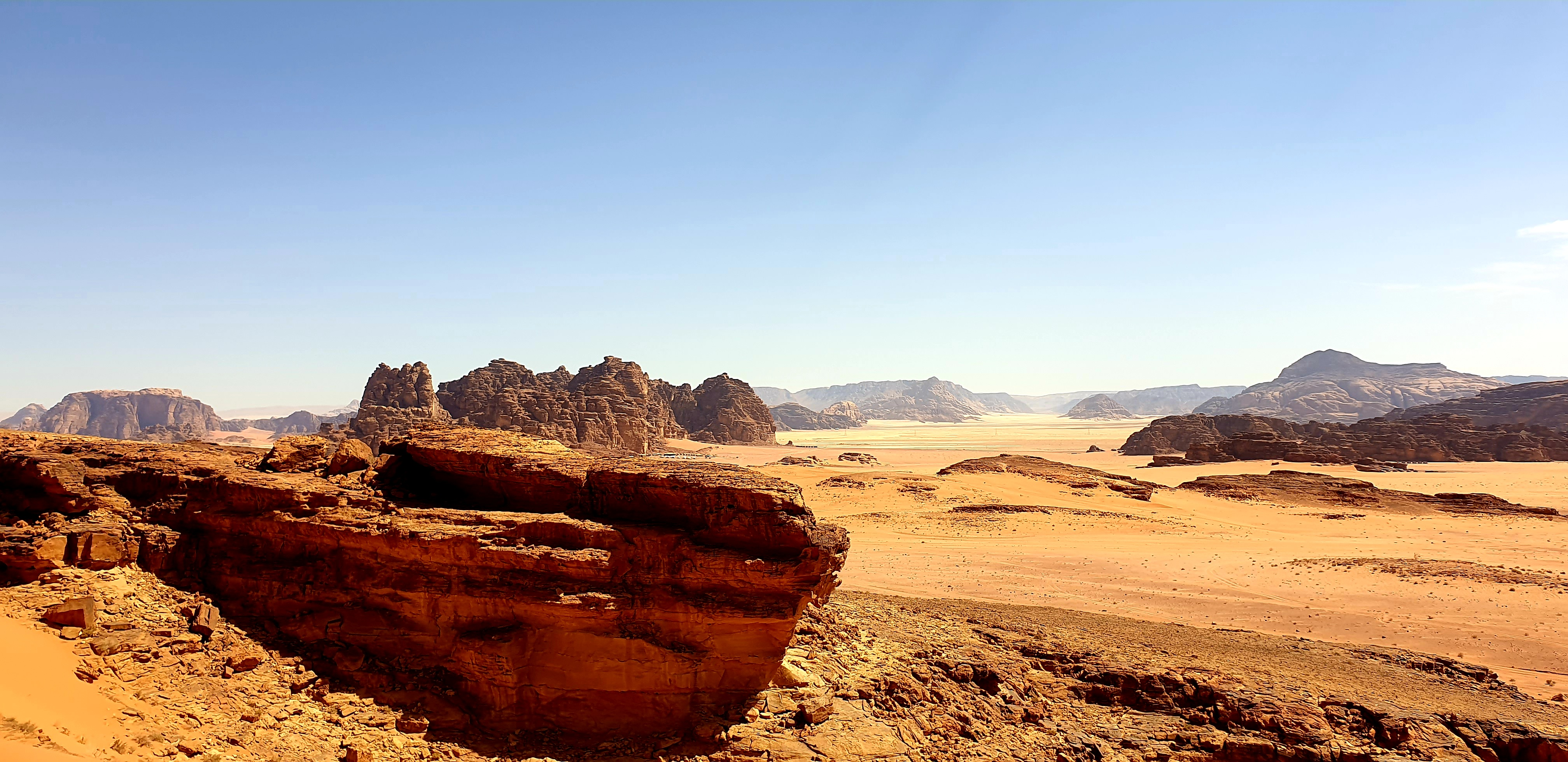
Wadi Rum rock formation

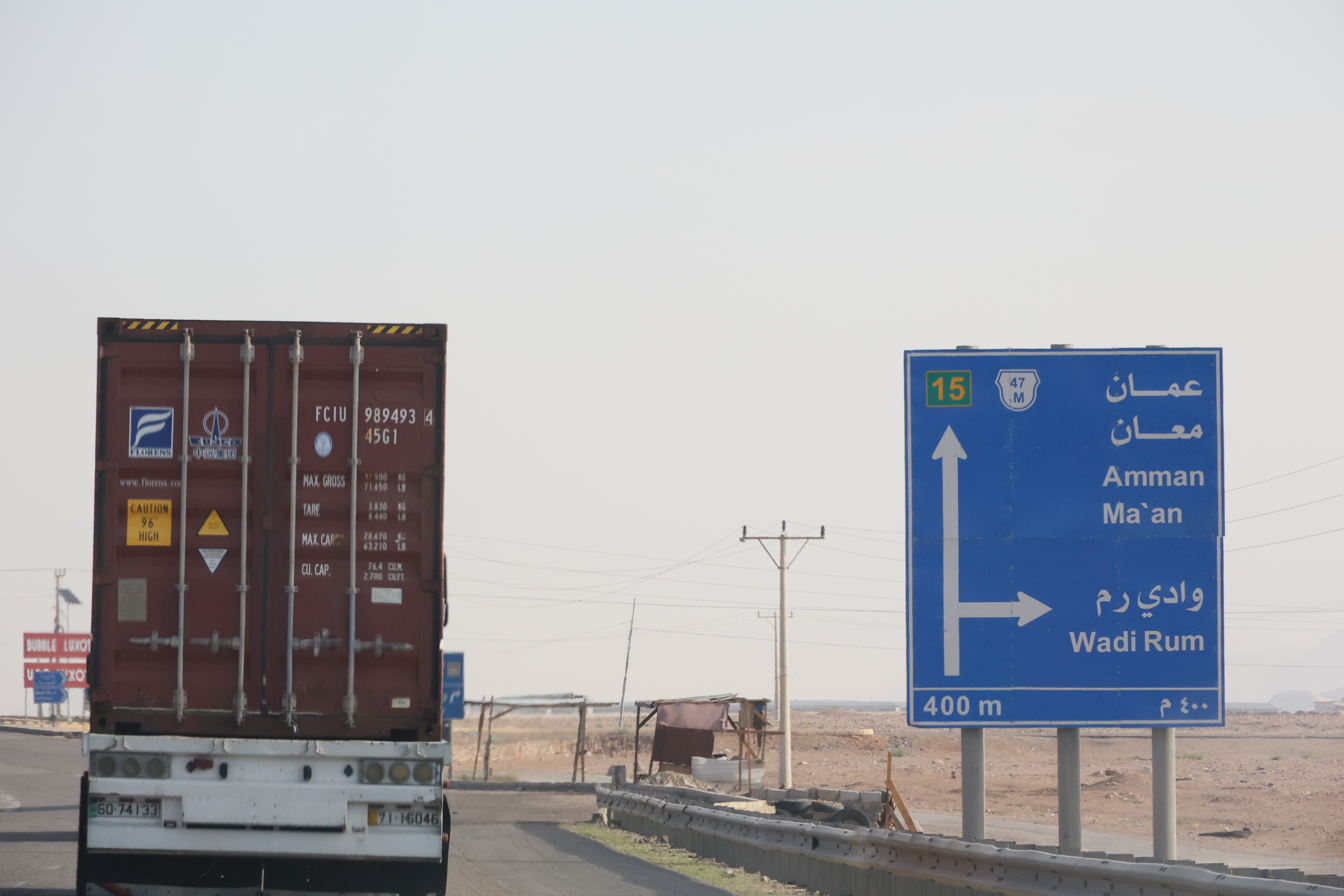
Wadi Rum road

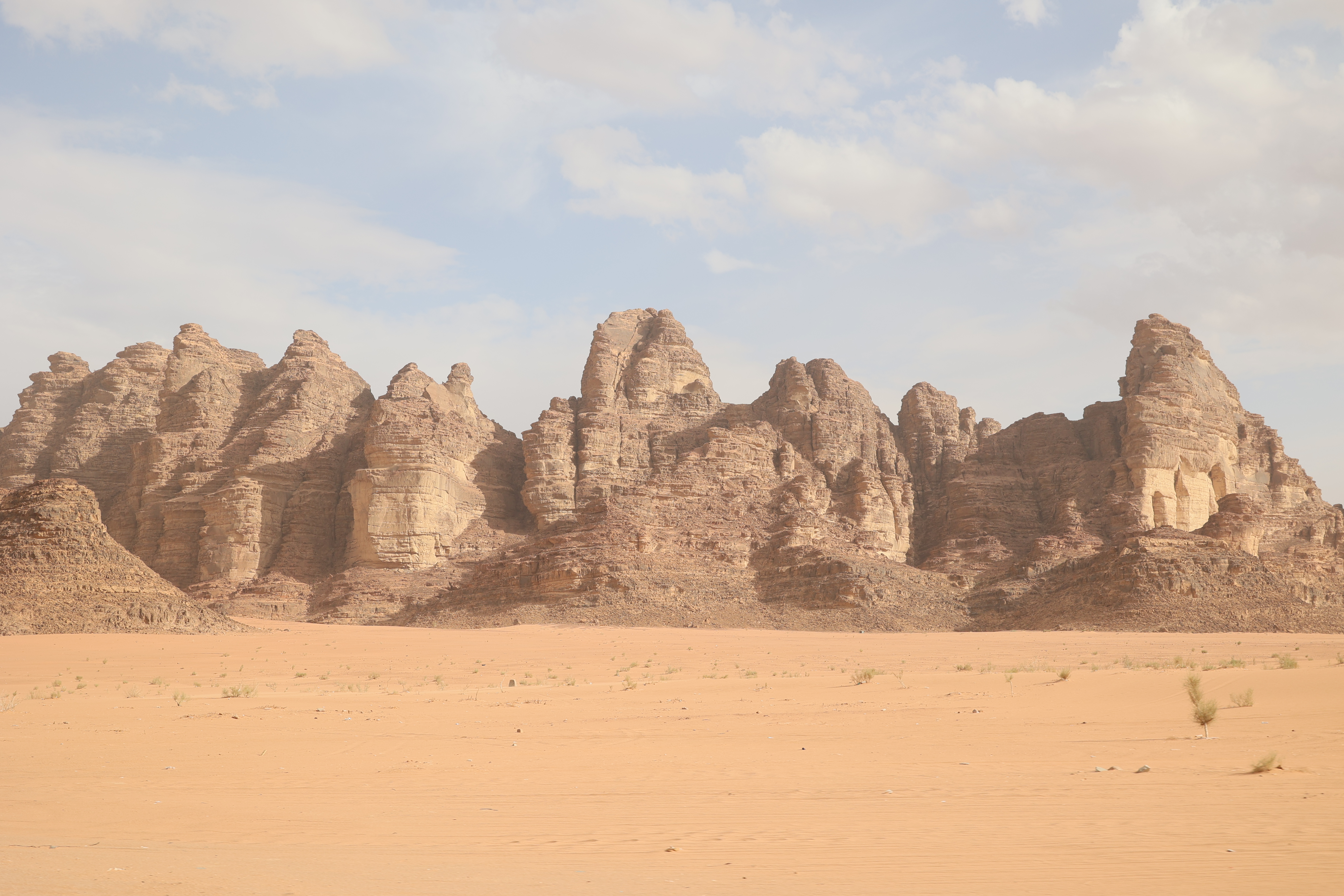
Wadi Rum

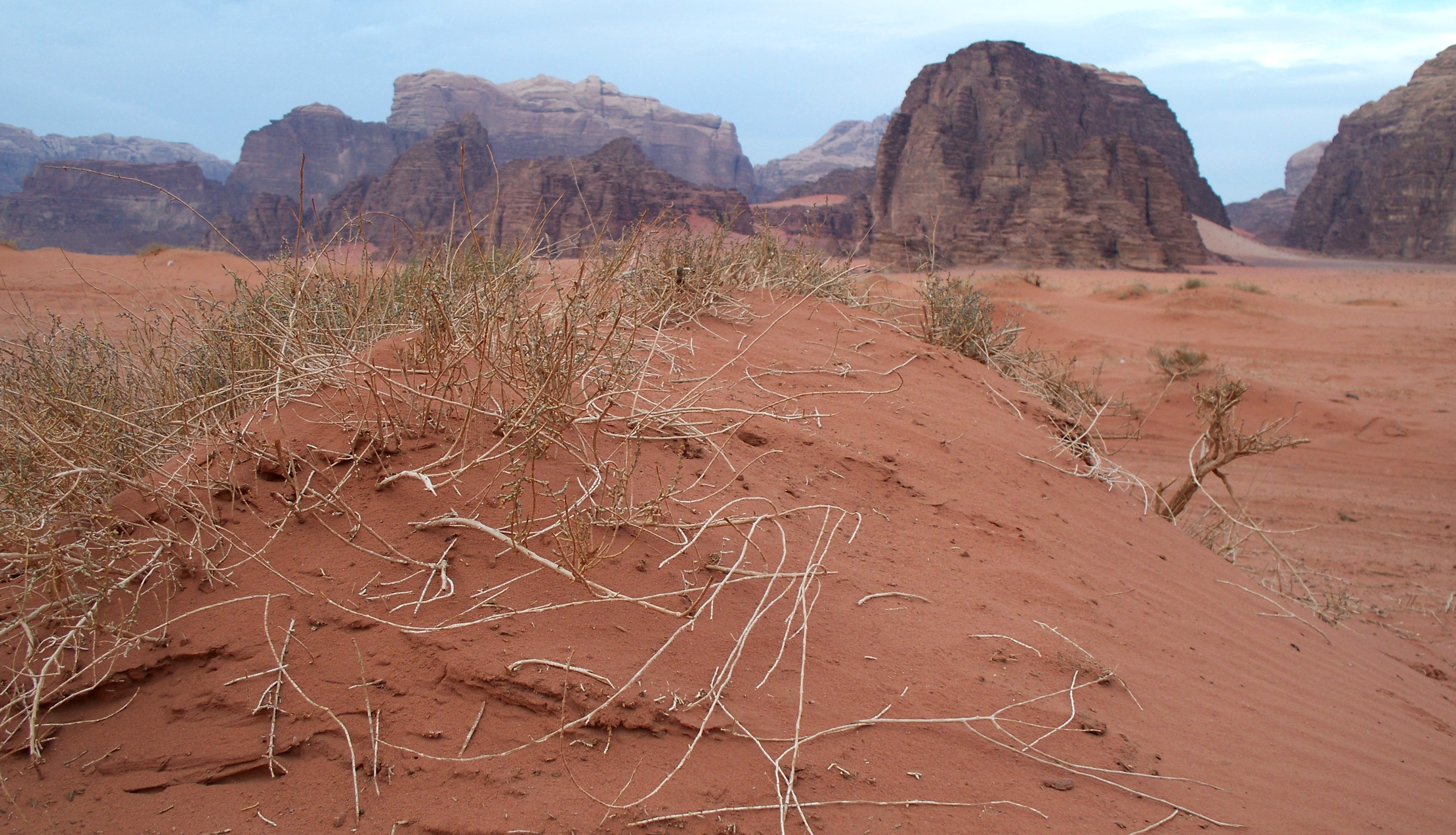
Wadi Rum desert

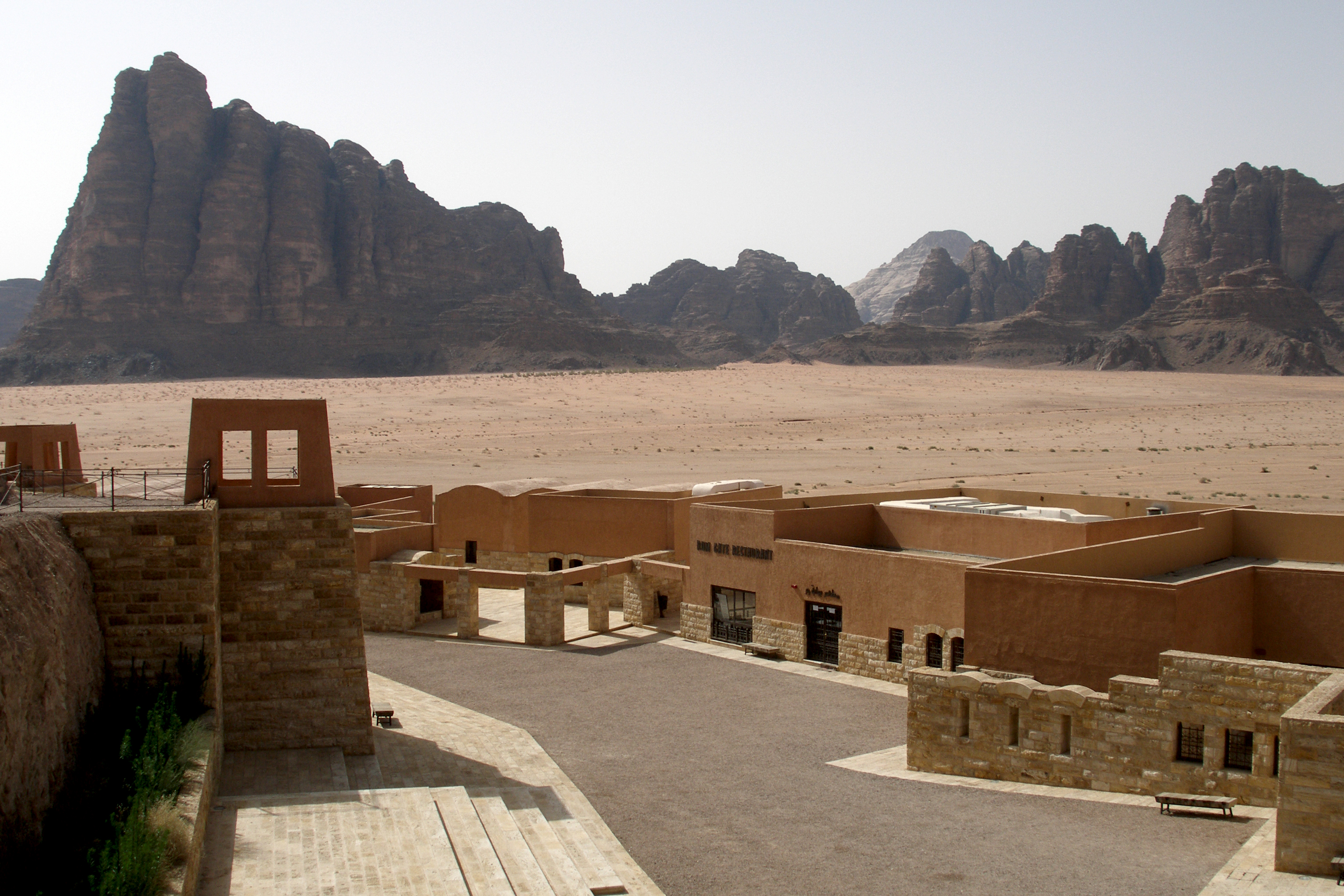
The Wadi Rum Visitor Center

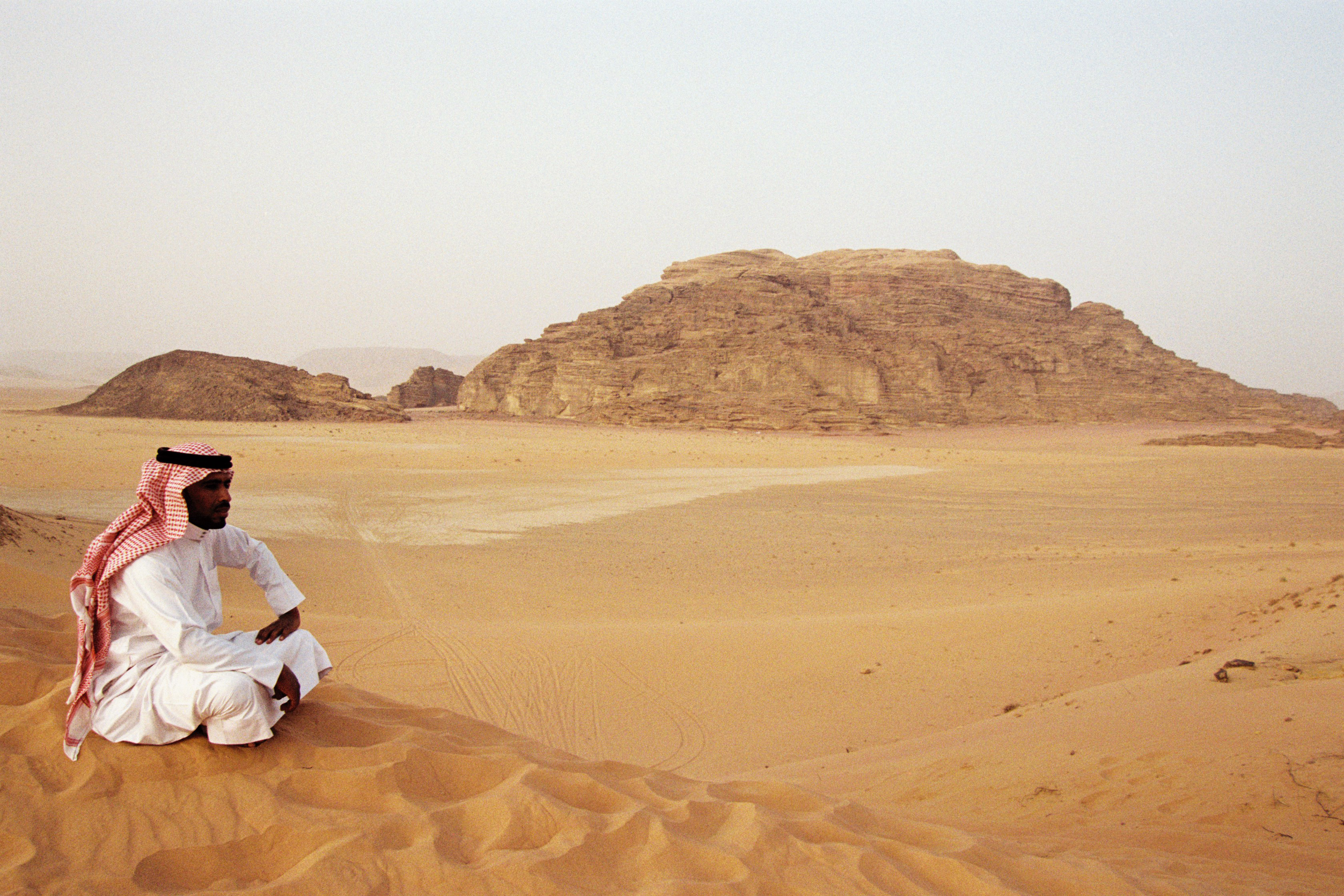
In 2011

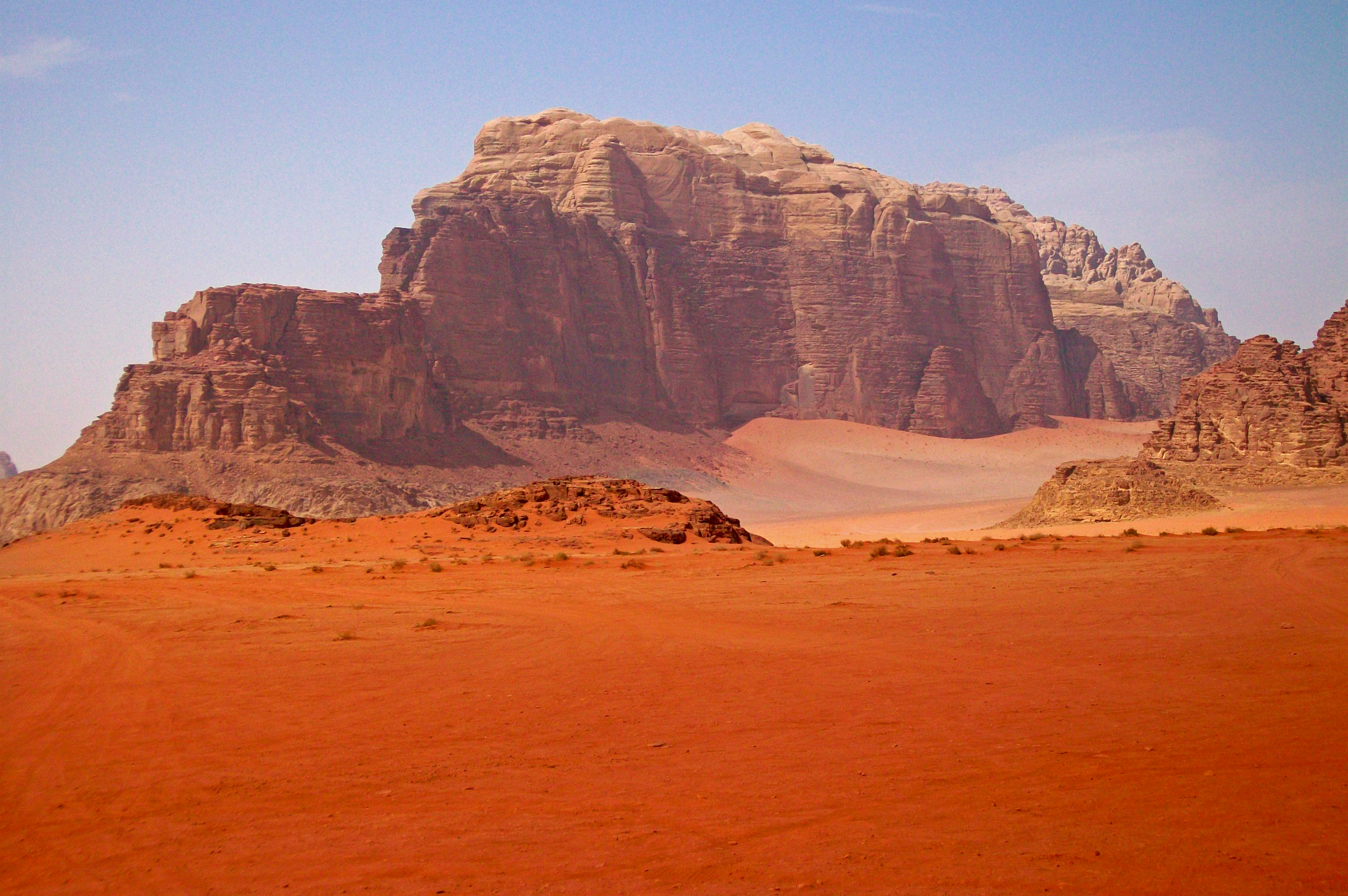
Mountain in Wadi Rum

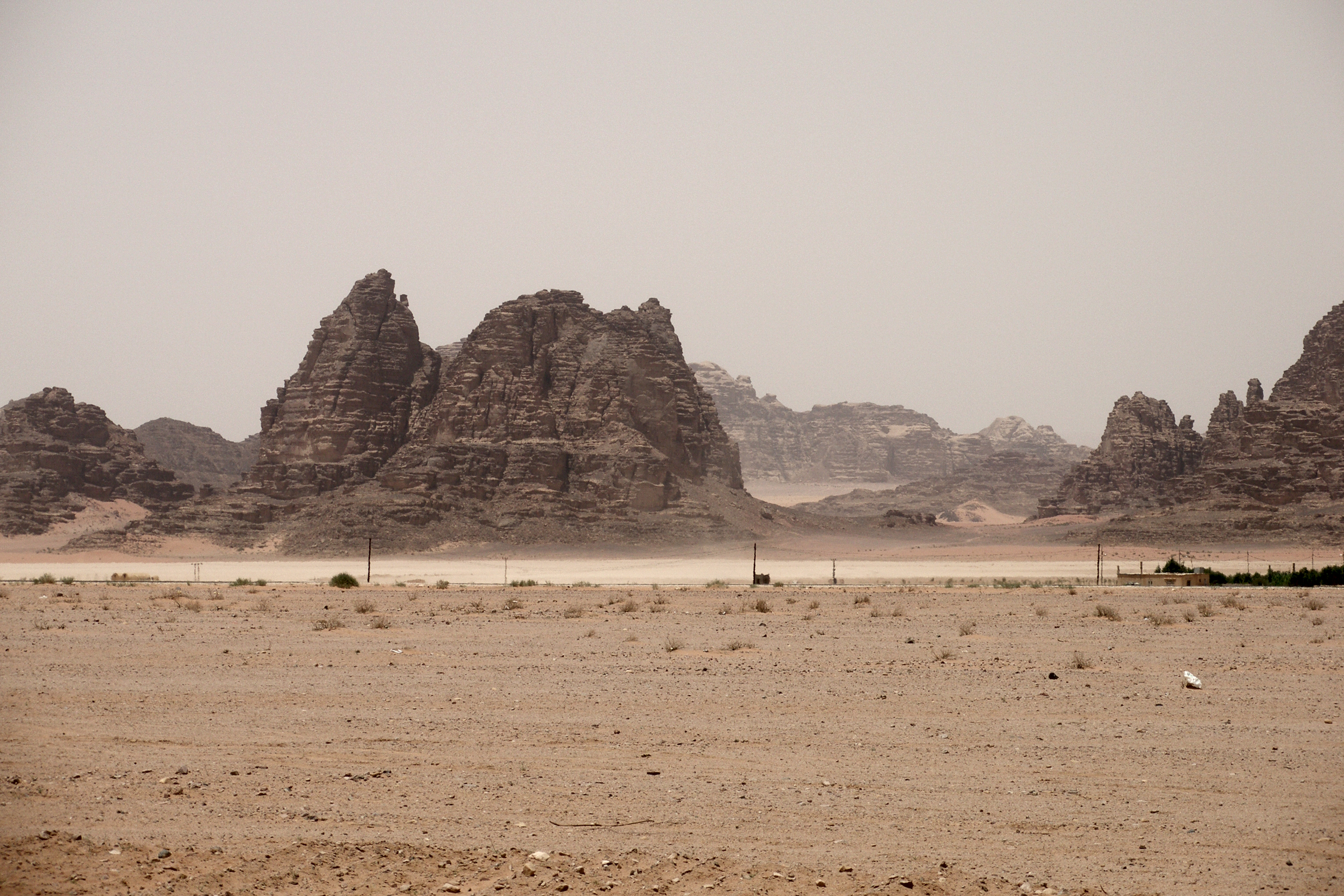
Wadi Rum rock formations along with Bedouin camps

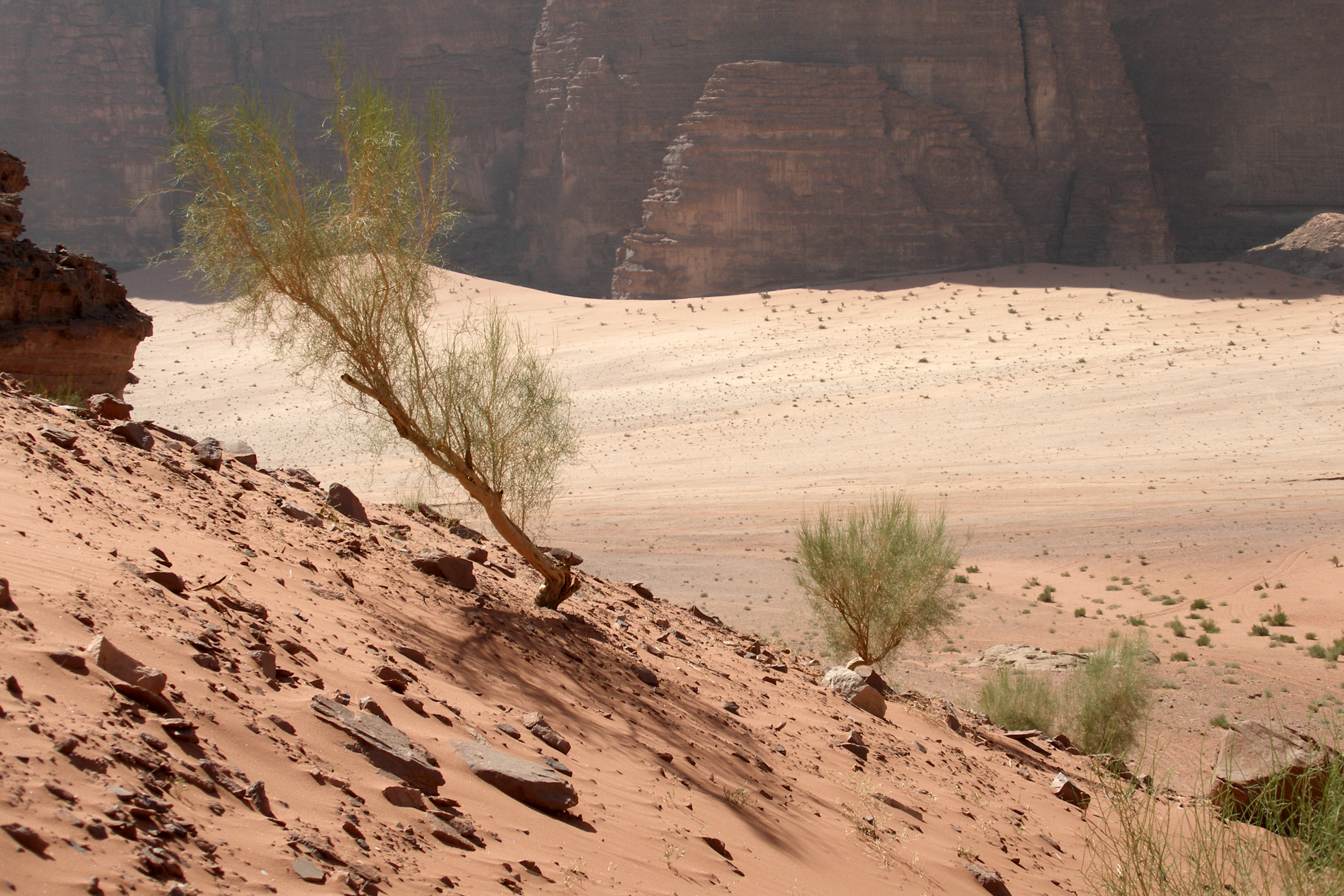
Plants in arid Wadi Rum landscape

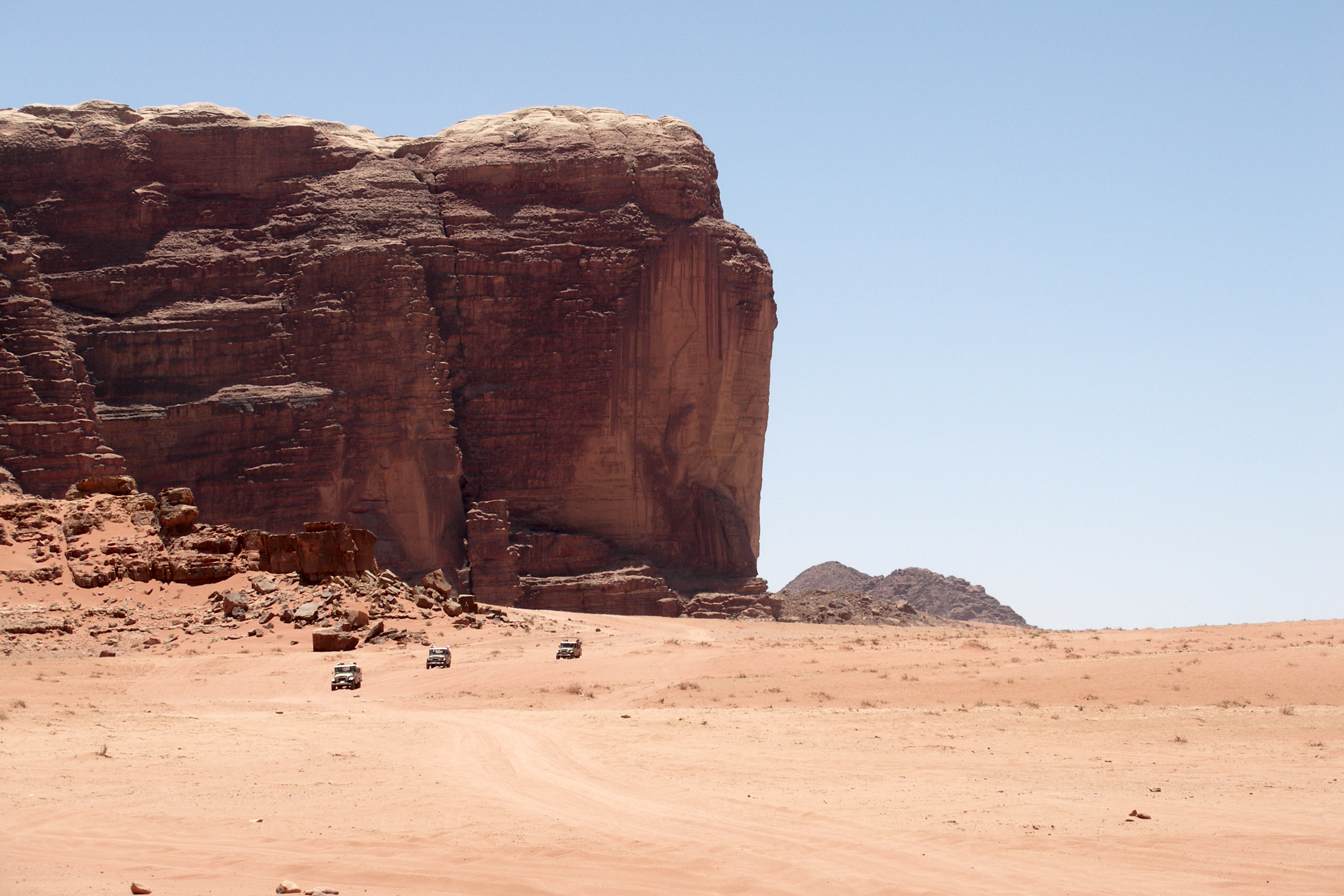
Khazali canyon

== See also ==
- List of World Heritage Sites in Jordan
- Nature reserves in Jordan
