= Jabal Umm ad Dami =

Highest mountain in Jordan

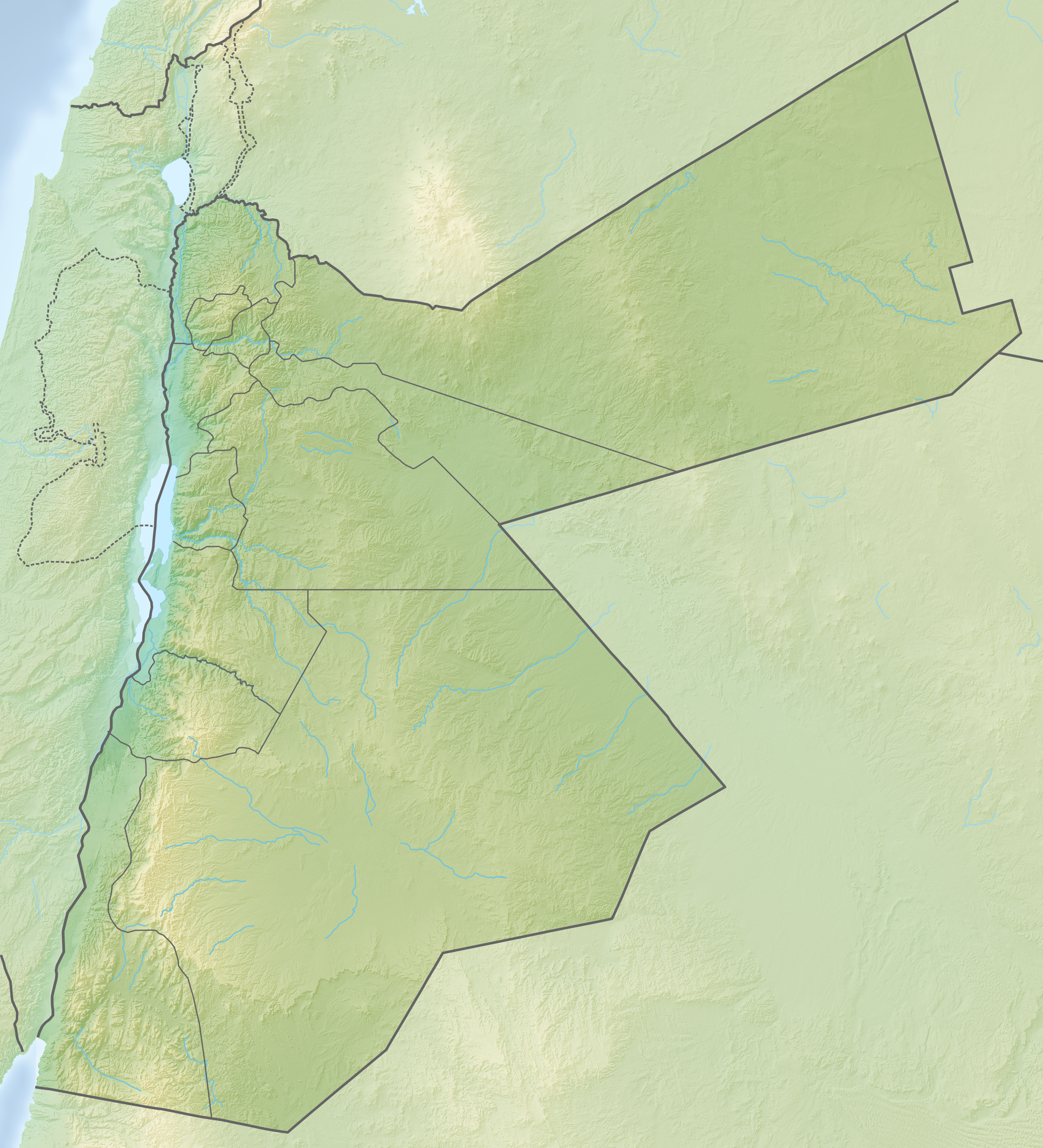
- Location within Jordan

Highest point
- Elevation: 1,854 m (6,083 ft)
- Listing: Country high point
- Coordinates: 29°18′30″N 35°25′45″E

Geography
- Location: Aqaba, Jordan

Jabal Umm ad Dami, in historic Wadi Rum, is the highest mountain in Jordan. Its claimed elevation of 1,854 metres is consistent with SRTM data. It is located at 29°18′30″N 35°25′45″E, near to the border with Saudi Arabia in the Aqaba Governorate of Jordan.

== See also ==
- List of elevation extremes by country
