= Economic and Social Council (Arab League) =

Institution of the Arab League that co-ordinates its economic integration

Economic and Social Council of the Arab League مجلس جامعة الدول العربية الاقتصادي والاجتماعي
- Flag Coat of arms

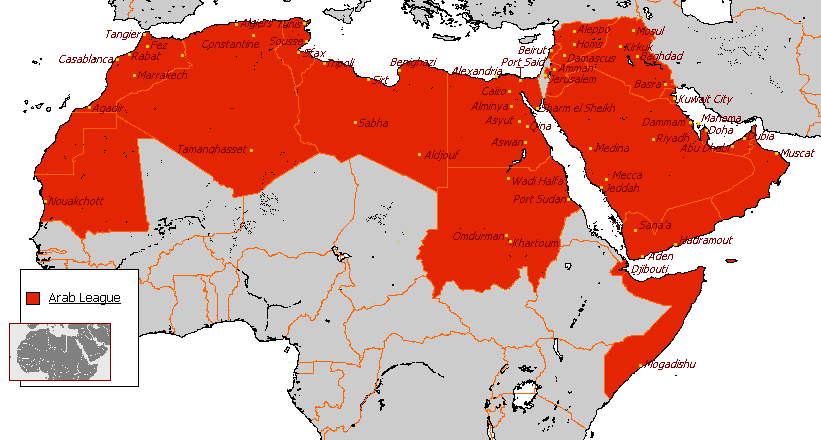
- Map of northern Africa and the Middle East indicating the members of the Arab League.
- Headquarters: Cairo, Egypt
- Official languages: Arabic
- Type: Arab League institution
- Membership: 22 states: Algeria; Bahrain; Comoros; Djibouti; Egypt; Iraq; Jordan; Kuwait; Lebanon; Libya; Mauritania; Morocco; Oman; Palestine; Qatar; Saudi Arabia; Somalia; Sudan; Syria; Tunisia; UAE; Yemen

Establishment
  - Treaty: 1950
  - First meeting: 1953

The Economic and Social Council of the Arab League (ESC; Arabic: مجلس جامعة الدول العربية الاقتصادي والاجتماعي, DIN: Majlis jāmiʿat ad-dawal al-ʿarabiya al-iqtiṣādy wal-ijtimāʿy, originally the Economic Council) is an institution of the Arab League that co-ordinates its economic integration. The ESC was established as the Economic Council under the terms of the Joint Defence and Economic Co-operation Treaty (1950). and held its first meeting in 1953. In 1957, the ESC established the Council of Arab Economic Unity (CAEU) and, in February 1997, the ESC adopted the Agreement to Facilitate and Develop Trade Among Arab Countries (1981) in pursuit of the Greater Arab Free Trade Area (GAFTA).

== History ==
The establishment of the Economic Council of the Arab League under the terms of the Joint Defence and Economic Co-operation Treaty (1950) was the fulfilment of the promise made in articles II and IV of the Arab League's Charter (1945), which required the establishment of a council to co-ordinate close co-operation of member-states in economic affairs.

The Economic Council was renamed the Economic and Social Council in 1980.

== Responsibilities ==
The ESC continues to administer the Greater Arab Free Trade Area and the Arab Fund for Economic and Social Development, as well as supervising the Council of Arab Economic Unity and other subsidiary institutions.

== Summits ==
The Arab Economic and Social Development summits (Arabic: القمة العربية الاقتصادية والتنموية والاجتماعية) are summits of the Arab League, held at the head of state level to address issues of economic and social development among member-states. The inaugural summit was held in 2009 in Kuwait, and the second summit was held in Egypt in 2011.

=== Background ===
On 29 March 2007, resolution 365, proposed by Egypt and Kuwait and calling for a summit to address exclusively the economic and social development issues facing the Arab world, was passed at the Arab League summit in Riyadh, Saudi Arabia.

In June 2007, the secretary-general of the Arab League convened an extraordinary session of the ESC, which had been tasked with organising the summit under the terms of resolution 365, and it was agreed that the responsibility of preparing for the first summit would fall to a preparatory committee, consisting of Saudi Arabia, Sudan, Syria, the chair of the ESC for the time being, and the two member-states that had proposed resolution 365, Egypt and Kuwait.

In October 2007, the secretary-general appointed Egyptian ambassador Mervat Tellawi the co-ordinator-general for the upcoming summit and established a management committee within the framework of the general secretariat of the Arab League, later renamed the Development Summit Management Committee, that included the newly appointed co-ordinator-general, Mervat Tellawi, and various assistant secretaries-general of the Arab League.

The summit was conceived as an opportunity to involve the private sector, and preparatory meetings were held by the Development Summit Management Committee with, inter alia, the Arab Banks Federation (November 2007), the General Union of Chambers of Commerce, Industry and Agriculture for Arab Countries (December 2007) and the Economic and Financial Affairs Committee of the Arab Parliament (May 2008).

By the 2008 Arab League summit in Damascus, Syria, advanced progress had been reported by the preparatory committee to the eighty-first session of the ESC, and having received an offer to host the summit from the emir of Kuwait, US$2 million was approved by the Arab League for financing.

=== 2009 summit ===
On 19–20 January 2009, the first Arab Economic and Social Development Summit was duly held in Kuwait. Coming almost immediately after the Gaza War, the Arab media praised the summit for its success in reconciling the Arab world, and various resolutions were passed "in solidarity with Gaza". Among the other resolutions passed, there was a call for adopting necessary measures to establish an Arab customs union as of 2010, to be fully operational by 2015, to ultimately establish an Arab common market.

=== 2011 summit ===
Leaving the 2009 summit, Ahmed Nazif, the former Egyptian prime minister, announced that Egypt would hold the next summit in 2011. Among the issues to be discussed is the proposed Arab Plan of Action for Science and Technology, adopted at the 2009 summit, the implementation of which is being led by UNESCO and its Arab equivalent, the Arab League Educational, Cultural and Scientific Organization (ALECSO).

=== 2013 summit ===
The 2013 summit was held in the Saudi capital city of Riyadh.

=== 2019 summit ===
The 2019 summit was to be held in the Lebanese capital of Beirut on 19–20 March 2019. The speaker of the Parliament of Lebanon Nabih Berri called to invite Syria back to the summit, which has caused major turmoil in the Arab League. The highly controversial summit has stirred tensions between Libya and the Lebanese Amal movement, stemming from the disappearance of Mussa Sadr, the Amal Movement's founder, who vanished along with his companions on August 31, 1978, in Libya while on an official visit.

=== 2023 summit ===
The 2023 summit was held in the Saudi city of Jeddah on 14–15 May 2023 as a preliminary meeting before 2023 Arab League Summit. The main goal of the summit was to secure the right circumstances to achieve economic stability and development in the region while highlighting the different initiatives it has launched be it related to food security or climate-action. Syria participated at the summit for the first time since 2011.

== Bibliography ==
- Ghantus, Elias T. (1982). Arab industrial integration. London: Croom Helm Limited. ISBN 0-7099-1117-3.
- Maher, Joanne, ed. (2004) [1926]. "League of Arab States". The Europa world year book. Vol. 1 (45 ed.). Europa Publications. ISBN 1-85743-254-1.
- Osmańczyk, Edmund Jan (2003). "League of Arab States". In Mango, Anthony (ed.). Encyclopedia of the United Nations and international agreements. Vol. 2 (3 ed.). New York: Routledge.
