= Institutions of the Arab League =

Decision-making and advisory institutions

The institutions of the Arab League are the permanent and non-permanent decision-making and advisory institutions created by the Charter of the Arab League and other agreements since the Arab League's establishment in 1945.

== Principal institutions ==
- Council of the Arab League
- Joint Defence and Economic Co-operation Treaty (1950):

- Economic and Social Council of the Arab League
- Joint Defence Council of the Arab League

Other important bodies are the Refugee Office, the Boycott of Israel Office, the Anti-Narcotic Office, and the Information Offices.

== Ministerial councils ==
- Council of Arab Ministries of Foreign Affairs.
- Council of Arab Ministries of Information.
- Council of Arab Ministries of Internal Affairs.
- Council of Arab Ministries of Justices.
- Council of Arab Ministries of Infrastructure.
- Council of Arab Ministries of Transportation.
- Council of Arab Ministries of Environment.
- Council of Arab Ministries of Communications.
- Council of Arab Ministries of Electricity.
- Council of Arab Ministries of Tourism.
- Council of Arab Ministries of Social Affairs.
- Council of Arab Ministries of Sports and Youth.
- Council of Arab Ministries of Medicine and Health.

== Military ==
Subsidiary to the Joint Defence Council of the Arab League:

- Permanent Military Committee (representatives of the Arab military)
- Chiefs-of-staff Advisory Committee
- Joint Arab Command (proposed 1961)
- United Arab Command (created 1964; de facto dissolved following 1967 Six-Day War)

== Economic ==
Subsidiary to the Economic and Social Council of the Arab League:

- Arab Fund for Economic and Social Development
- Council of Arab Economic Unity
- Greater Arab Free Trade Area
- Arab Customs Union
- Arab Economic and Social Development summits

== Cultural ==
- Arab League Educational, Cultural and Scientific Organization

- Institute of Arab Research and Studies
- Arab Centre for Arabization, Translation, Authorship and Publication
- Arabization Coordination Bureau
- Institute of Arab Manuscripts
- International Institute for the Arabic Language, Khartoum

== Bibliography ==
- Oron, Yitzhak, ed. (1960), Middle East Record, vol. 1, London: George Weidenfeld & Nicolson Limited
