= Joint Defence and Economic Co-operation Treaty =

1950 treaty among the members of the Arab League

Treaty of Joint Defence and Economic Co-operation of the League of Arab States
- Type: Collective security
- Signed: 18 June 1950
- Location: Cairo, Egypt
- Parties: Arab League member-states
- Language: Arabic

The Treaty of Joint Defence and Economic Co-operation of the League of Arab States (commonly, the Joint Defence and Economic Co-operation Treaty) is a treaty among the member states of the Arab League signed on 18 June 1950 in Cairo, Egypt.

The Treaty created two of the principal institutions of the Arab League:

- the Joint Defence Council
- the Economic Council (renamed Economic and Social Council in 1980)

Both councils report to the Council of the Arab League.

== Bibliography ==
- Ghantus, Elias T. (1982). Arab industrial integration. London: Croom Helm Limited. ISBN 0-7099-1117-3.
- Osmańczyk, Edmund Jan (2003). "League of Arab States Treaty of Joint Defense and Economic Cooperation, 1950". In Mango, Anthony (ed.). Encyclopedia of the United Nations and international agreements. Vol. 2 (3 ed.). New York: Routledge.
