= Issa Suwaid =

Bahraini educator and sports administrator (1949–2016)

- عيسى سويد
- Born: Issa Mohammed Suwaid; October 1949; Bahrain
- Died: 4 December 2016 (aged 67)
- Resting place: Ana Anbara Cemetery, Al-Burhama
- Occupations: Educator and sports administrator
- Organization: Bahrain Handball Federation
- Known for: Directing the Referees' Committee at the Bahrain Handball Federation

Issa Mohammed Suwaid (Arabic: عيسى محمد سويد; October 1949 – 4 December 2016) was a Bahraini educator and sports administrator.

== Early life and education ==
Born in October 1949, Suwaid obtained a diploma from the Bahrain Teachers’ College in 1969 and one in School Administration in 1999. He took many other courses, including one on the administration of adult education institutions in 1983 and multiple courses on administration and curricular development from the Arab League Educational, Cultural and Scientific Organization.

== Educational career ==
Suwaid started his teaching career at the Al-Khamis Primary Boys School and his first administrative post was at the Bilad Al Qadeem Preparatory Boys School. An assistant director of Othman Ibn Affan Preparatory Boys School, he rose at last to Director of the Al Khaleel Bin Ahmed Intermediate Boys School, the post he held at his 2005 retirement.

== Athletic career ==
Suwaid played handball, basketball, and volleyball at Al Ittihad Club. After retiring from playing, he took several referee courses and embarked on a career as such from 1977 to 1998. He chaired the Bahrain Handball Federation (BHF) Referees’ Committee from 1992 to 2004, implementing the latest rules and mentoring a generation of new referees in tandem with retired referee Radhi Habib. He served on the board of directors of the Arab Handball Federation from 2000 to 2005 and as Executive Director of the BHF from 2005 to 2011. He participated as such in many global and regional handball tournaments.

== Bahraini uprising of 2011 ==
The Bahrain Centre for Human Rights claimed on 10 April 2011, that Suwaid was dismissed that year from his BHF posts (including honorary) of the referees’ committee in retaliation for his participation in the athletes’ solidarity march at the Pearl Roundabout in support of the Bahraini uprising of 2011 that February and March. The liberal pro-government newspaper Al Ayam claimed that he retired due to old age.

== Awards ==
On 7 June 2016, Nasser bin Hamad Al Khalifa, the King of Bahrain’s Envoy for Charitable Works and Chairman of the Supreme Council for Youth and Sports and Bahrain Olympic Committee, honored Suwaid as one of several Bahraini sports administrators at the international level, awarding him the Isa bin Rashid Al Khalifa Award for Merit.

== Personal life ==
Suwaid was married.

== Death ==
Suwaid died on 4 December 2016.
