= BLS International Services =

Indian visa and consular outsourcing company

BLS International Services Limited
- Type: Public
- Traded as: BSE: 540073; NSE: BLS
- Industry: Outsourcing; Government services
- Founded: 2005; 21 years ago in New Delhi, India
- Founder: Diwakar Aggarwal
- Headquarters: New Delhi, India
- Area served: 100+ countries
- Key people: Diwakar Aggarwal (Chairman); Shikhar Aggarwal (Joint MD); Scott Morrison (Global Strategic Advisor)
- Services: Visa and consular outsourcing; Passport services; Attestation; E-governance
- Revenue: ₹2,998 crore (US$310 million) (2026)
- Subsidiaries: BLS E-Services
- Website: www.blsinternational.com

BLS International Services Limited is an Indian company heaquartered in New Delhi. It processes visa, passport and consular applications for governments and diplomatic missions, and provides domestic e-governance and financial-inclusion services through its subsidiary BLS E-Services. The company operates visa application centres and handles application processing and biometric enrolment; decisions on individual applications are made by the client governments. It is listed on the National Stock Exchange and the Bombay Stock Exchange

BLS International began operations in 2005. As of 2026 the company reported operations in more than 100 countries.

== History ==
BLS International was established after the increasing outsourcing of administrative visa-processing services by governments. The company's first embassy engagement was with the Portuguese embassy in New Delhi, followed by work for other European missions. In 2008 it secured its first large contract from the Indian government, operating for the Indian embassy in Kuwait.

Between 2005 and 2015 the company opened visa application centres in the United Arab Emirates and Southeast Asia and took on several Indian diplomatic missions, including posts in the United States and Canada, the Consulate General of India in Hong Kong and the High Commission of India in Kuala Lumpur. It won a global visa contract for Spain, which broadened its work for European governments. Shikhar Aggarwal, son of the founder, joined the business in 2014 and became joint managing director.

The company was listed on the National Stock Exchange and the Bombay Stock Exchange in 2016. In the same year it entered domestic digital and government-to-citizen (G2C) services in India. In 2018 it began providing support to Sopra Steria and UK Visas and Immigration for visa renewals in the United Kingdom.

== Business and operations ==
BLS International operates in two segments. Visa and consular services account for about 80% of revenue and include visa processing, passport and attestation work, biometric enrolment, e-visa issuance and related value-added services for embassies and consulates. In April 2026 the company signed an MoU with the India and Arab Countries Chamber of Commerce, Industry and Agriculture to expand commercial attestation services in India. Digital services, run through the subsidiary BLS E-Services, account for the remainder and serve the Indian market.

=== Digital services ===
The digital services segment provides business correspondent services for banks such as the State Bank of India and Punjab National Bank in areas without bank branches. The company also provides e-governance services including citizen-document and registration services. In August 2025 BLS was awarded a contract by the Unique Identification Authority of India to operate district-level Aadhaar Seva Kendras. In July 2026 the Government of West Bengal, in association with the National Health Authority, selected the company as one of the card-approver agencies for the Ayushman Bharat Pradhan Mantri Jan Arogya Yojana and the Ayushman Vay Vandana scheme.

=== Acquisitions ===
In 2022 BLS E-Services acquired a majority stake in Zero Mass Private Limited, a business correspondent partner within the State Bank of India network. In 2024 BLS International acquired iDATA, a Turkey-based visa processor operating in about 15 countries, and Citizenship Invest, a Dubai firm working on citizenship-by-investment programmes for more than 20 governments. The same year it took a 57 percent stake in Aadifidelis Solutions, a loan processing company, at a valuation of about ₹190 crore (US$20 million).

== Recognition ==
BLS International was included in Forbes Asia's "Best Under a Billion" list in 2018 and has appeared in Fortune India's Next 500 and the Business Today BT500 ranking of Indian companies by market capitalisation.

== Regulatory and legal issues ==
=== 2025 MEA tender dispute ===
On 9 October 2025 the Indian Ministry of External Affairs (MEA) issued an order debarring BLS International from bidding for future tenders of the ministry and Indian missions abroad for two years, citing pending court cases and complaints from applicants. The company disclosed the order to the stock exchanges on 11 October and said its existing contracts were not affected, adding that Indian missions accounted for about 12 percent of consolidated revenue and 8 percent of EBITDA in the first quarter of the 2026 financial year. Its shares fell about 12 percent on the day the ban was reported. BLS International challenged the order through a writ petition, and in December 2025 the Delhi High Court set aside the debarment, restoring the company's eligibility to bid for MEA tenders. Separately, on 16 October 2025 the company was awarded a three-year MEA contract to establish and operate Indian Visa Application Centres in Beijing, Shanghai and Guangzhou, effective 14 October 2025.

=== Consumer commission ruling ===
In November 2025, the Navsari Consumer Disputes Redressal Commission found BLS International jointly liable with a courier company after a customer's passport was returned in a damaged condition. The commission imposed a ₹10,000 penalty on BLS for appointing the courier, while directing the logistics provider to compensate the complainant for the resulting financial losses.
