= United Arab Command =

The United Arab Command (UAC) (also Unified Arab Command or Joint Arab Command) was a unified Arab military command established by unanimous resolution of the thirteen member states of the Arab League at the summit held in Cairo, Egypt, on 13–16 January 1964.

== Origins ==
=== Predecessors ===
The UAC was the culmination of a history of pan-Arabist collective security initiatives, which began to coalesce from 1960 until the UAC's formal creation in 1964. The Permanent Military Committee (PMC) of the Arab League, composed of representatives from the headquarters of the Arab armies, had been asked on 29 February 1960 by the Council of the Arab League to prepare a comprehensive plan for all possible contingencies arising from Israeli water diversion initiatives. The PMC's response was that joint military action would require extensive preparation and that the Chief-of-Staffs Committee (the Military Advisory Committee) should be invoked to set up a joint apparatus of approximately 100 officers.

Another pan-Arabist body, the Joint Defence Council, consisting of Arab foreign and defence ministers and chiefs-of-staff, met in Cairo (10 – 18 June 1961) and proposed the establishment of a Joint Arab Command. The UAR encouraged the delegation of decisive power to the commanding officer of this new command; under the terms of the 1950 Arab Joint Security Pact, such a commanding officer "would be chosen from the member state with the largest troop presence", namely Egypt.

=== Background ===
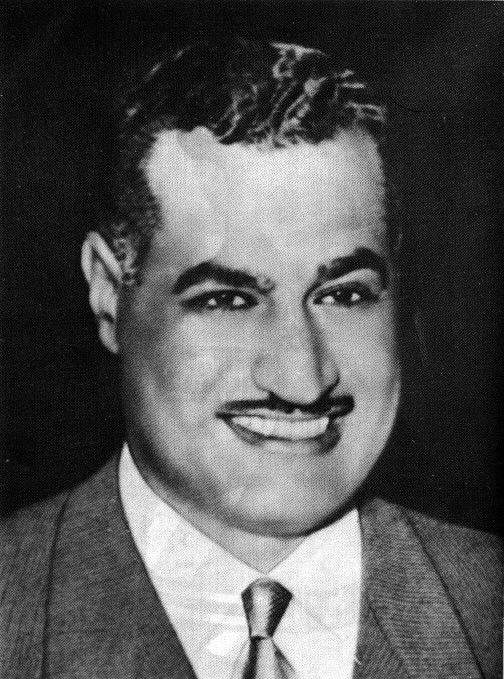
Egyptian president Gamal Abdel Nasser (1918 - 1970) proposed the United Arab Command at the first Arab League summit.

The UAC was proposed by Egyptian president Gamal Abdel Nasser (1918 – 1970) in the face of repeated Syrian accusations of Egyptian reluctance for military confrontation with Israel, although the more immediate catalyst was Israel's proposed diversion of water from Lake Tiberias. The creation of the UAC was part of the Arab League's response to Israel's proposal, together with a plan to divert two sources of the River Jordan: the Hasbani River and the Banias.

The creation of the UAC was announced by Cairo Radio; no mention of the UAC was made in the official communiqué from the summit, although the secretary-general of the Arab League himself, Abdel Khalek Hassouna, had stated that certain adopted resolutions would remain secret.

=== Response ===
Hussein, king of Jordan, had experience of joint defence arrangements among the Arab states, and was not particularly enthusiastic about the establishment of the UAC. Nonetheless, he gave it his support, and later charged the UAC with command of the military operations of the Palestine Liberation Organization (PLO) as a condition to Jordan's co-operation, lest the PLO draw Jordan into a war with Israel for which it was ill-prepared.

Michael Stewart, British foreign minister (22 January 1965 – 11 August 1966), in a memorandum to the Defence and Oversea Policy cabinet committee, wrote that the formation of the UAC and its undertaking of "ostensibly defensive military planning against Israel" constituted a "somewhat more dangerous phase" of the Arab–Israeli conflict. Certainly, Britain conceded that the UAC had become a "relatively competent and effective body", capable of ordering a retaliatory action against Israel should the Arab water diversion plan come under attack.

Arthur Lourie, Israeli ambassador to Britain, claimed that the establishment of the UAC had raised the tension in the region and had enabled Egypt to gain control over the military forces of its fellow Arab states.

== Organisation ==
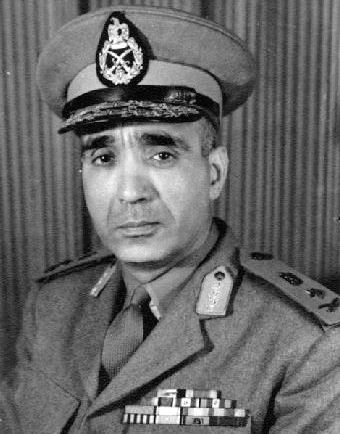
Abdul Munim Riad (1919-1969), commander-in-chief of the United Arab Command from 1967.

The UAC was to be headed by an Egyptian lieutenant general, Ali Ali Amer, and with headquarters in Cairo. Notwithstanding the Egyptian bent to the UAC, its cost of creation, GBP 15 million, was mostly contributed by the oil-rich member states, with Saudi Arabia and Kuwait topping the list.

Following the 1966 Samu Incident, Egypt and Jordan agreed to revitalise the UAC in May 1967, appointing as its new commander Abdul Munim Riad, chief of staff of the Egyptian military.

== Tasks ==
An early task of the UAC was the auditing of the Arab armies, in respect of strength and organisation, and, at the request of Hussein, King of Jordan, the command of the PLO's military operations.

However, meaningful action by the UAC against Israel was given two pre-conditions by the commander-in-chief, Ali Ali Amer, at the second Arab League summit, held in Alexandria, Egypt, in September 1964. Firstly, the confrontation states – Lebanon, Jordan and Syria – must allow the UAC to station foreign Arab troops on their soil at the UAC's discretion. Secondly, there must be co-ordination and standardisation of strategy, tactics, organisation and weaponry. While the second pre-condition was agreed to in principle, the three confrontation states baulked at allowing Egyptian encroachment on their territory.

== Decline ==
=== Operation Shredder ===
The pre-conditions to military action set at the September 1964 Arab League summit proved insurmountable: in November 1966, the Israeli military stormed the village of as-Samu in the Jordanian-controlled West Bank in an operation code-named Shredder. Casualties among the Jordanian military numbered 16, with 3 civilians and 1 Israeli. In the aftermath to the incident, the UAC was noticeable for its inaction.

=== Six-Day War ===
Following the Samu Incident, Jordan and Egypt, in signing a mutual defence pact on 30 May 1967, agreed to revitalise the UAC, placing it under the command of Abdul Munim Riad, chief of staff of the Egyptian military. Nonetheless, when the 1967 Six-Day War began, the UAC was no longer considered an active body.

== Bibliography ==
- Ashton, S. R.; Louis, William Roger, eds. (2004), East of Suez and the Commonwealth, 1964 - 1971: part 1: East of Suez, British documents on the end of empire: A, vol. 5, Norwich: The Stationery Office, ISBN 0-11-290582-X
- Dasgupta, Punyapriya (1988). Cheated by the world: the Palestinian experience. New Delhi: Orient Longman Limited. ISBN 0-86131-827-7.
- Gat, Moshe (2003). Britain and the conflict in the Middle East, 1964 - 1967: the coming of the Six-Day War. Westport, Connecticut: Praeger Publishers. ISBN 0-275-97514-2.
- Hof, Frederic C. (2000), "The water dimension of Golan Heights negotiations", in Amery, Hussein A.; Wolf, Aaron T. (eds.), Water in the Middle East: a geography of peace, University of Texas Press
- Oren, Michael B. (2002). Six days of war: June 1967 and the makings of the modern Middle East. New York: Oxford University Press.
- Salibi, Kamal (2006) [1993]. The modern history of Jordan. London: I. B. Tauris and Company Limited. ISBN 1-86064-331-0.
- Shemesh, Moshe (2003), "Arab strategy towards the Arab-Israeli conflict, January 1964 to June 1967", in Gammer, Moshe (ed.), Political thought and political history: studies in memory of Elie Kedourie, London: Frank Caas Publishers, ISBN 0-7146-5296-2
