= Military of the Arab League =

The Arab League as an organization has military force, like the United Nations or the European Union, but in the 2007 summit, the Leaders decided to reactivate their joint defense and establish a peacekeeping force to deploy in South Lebanon, Iraq, South Sudan, Federal Republic of Ethiopia and other hot spots.

== History ==
The military history of the Arab League is closely linked to the Arab–Israeli conflict. The 1950 Arab Joint Security Pact set out provisions for collective security among the Arab states, but only in 1961 was the Joint Arab Command (JAC) proposed as a unified military command for the Arab League first by the Joint Defence Council, an institution of the Arab League.

Before the JAC could take shape, a unanimous resolution was passed at the first Arab League summit (January 1964) establishing the United Arab Command (UAC), although the UAC's inactivity following the Samu Incident (1966) and during the Six-Day War (1967) signalled its de facto dissolution.

=== Arab Liberation Army ===
The Arab Liberation Army (جيش الإنقاذ العربي Jaysh al-Inqadh al-Arabi), also translated as Arab Countries Salvation Army, was an army of volunteers from Arab countries led by Fawzi al-Qawuqji. It fought on the Arab side in the 1948 Palestine war and was set up by the Arab League as a counter to the Arab High Committee's Holy War Army, though in fact the League and Arab governments prevented thousands from joining either force.

At the meeting in Damascus on 5 February 1948 to organize Palestinian Field Commands, Northern Palestine including Samaria was allocated to Qawuqji's forces, although Samaria was de facto already under the control of Transjordan.

The Arab League Military Committee, with headquarters in Damascus, was responsible for the movements and servicing of the Army. The Committee consisted of General: Ismail Safwat (Iraq, Commander-in-Chief), General: Taha al-Hashimi (Iraq), Colonel: Shuqayri (Lebanon), Colonel: Muhammed al-Hindi (Syria) and Colonel: Abd al-Qadir al-Jundi (Transjordan).

The ALA was dissolved at the end of the Palestine War.

Egypt's membership was suspended in 1979 after it signed a peace treaty with Israel; the league's headquarters was moved from Cairo, Egypt, to Tunis, Tunisia. In 1987, AL leaders decided to renew diplomatic ties with Egypt, who was readmitted in 1989 and the league's headquarters was moved back to Cairo.

== Current strength of Arab League member states ==
Numbers of military personnel
member state		Active Military	Police	Reserve	Paramilitary	Total	Per 1,000 capita	
total	active	Active Military	Police		Paramilitary	Total		
Algeria	520,000	150,000	Police	187,200	857,200	Total	19.2	11.6
Bahrain	18,400	35,805	11,260	65,465	9,461,381.3	2659274.7		
Egypt	438,500	479,000	397,000	1,314,500	10,896,417.2	3634902.2		
Iraq	193,000	664,169	230,000	1,087,169	23,989,777.5	4258792.4		
Jordan	100,500	65,000	15,000	180,500	16,144,081.4	8988809.9		
Kuwait	72,000	24,000	7,100	103,100	24,006,775	16765158.1		
Lebanon	95,000	35,000	20,000	150,000	28,318,910.2	17935309.8		
Libya	35,000	65,000	22,500	122,500	17,364,819.8	4961377.1		
Morocco	195,000	150,000	50,000	395,000	10.4	5.1		
Oman	128,000	100,000	4,450	232,450	51,421,632.8	28315633.5		
Palestine	20,000	12,500	2,223	34,723	6,642,762.2	3826145.3		
Qatar	66,550	15,000	5,000	86,550	30,960,649.4	23806253.2		
Saudi Arabia	257,000	250,000	24,500	531,500	13,840,785.4	6692534		
Sudan	109,300	85,000	17,500	211,800	4.3	2.2		
Syria	170,000	150,000	100,000	420,000	19	7.7		
Tunisia	89,800	40,000	12,000	141,800	12.1	7.7		
United Arab Emirates	65,000	130,000	18,500	213,500	23,032,247.7	7012159.7		
Yemen	66,700	55,000	14,500	136,200	3,973,439	1945876.5		
Arab League	2.990,290	2.588,194	1.006,610	6.585094	14.2	6.5		

== List of Arab League member states by military expenditure ==
Member state	Population	GDP (nominal) ($billions)	Defence expenditure (US$)	
Member state	Population	GDP (nominal) ($billions)	Total ($millions)	% real GDP
Algeria	44,700,000	187.155	18,263.97	8.2
Bahrain	1,463,265	43.544	1,383.78	3.1
Comoros	956,886	1.242	—N/a	—N/a
Djibouti	957,273	3.725	36.6	2.63
Egypt	104,635,983	469.094	3,164.63	0.9
Iraq	45,318,011	282.876	5,108.40	2.1
Jordan	11,180,568	48.066	2,450.24	4.9
Kuwait	4,294,621	183.568	7,755.03	4.9
Lebanon	5,296,814	21.780	241.29	8.9
Libya	7,054,493	40.836	3,755.7	15.48
Mauritania	4,614,974	10.091	277.16	2.5
Morocco	37,984,655	142.874	5,184.93	3.6
Oman	4,520,471	108.969	5,851.76	5.4
Palestine	5,227,193	18.818	—N/a	—N/a
Qatar	2,795,484	221.369	15,412.1	6.96
Saudi Arabia	38,401,000	1,010.588	75,813.33	7.1
Somalia	17,066,000	8.416	143.47	—N/a
Sudan	49,197,555	42.762	3,180.5	0.92
Syria	22,125,249	11.080	2,494.9	4.06
Tunisia	11,708,370	46.282	1,208.20	2.4
United Arab Emirates	9,269,612	503.913	22,755.1	5.64
Yemen	34,277,612	27.594	1,714.8	3.97
Arab League	462,940,089	3,434.640	168,995.41	4.44
