= International College, Beirut =

International College
- الكلية الدولية في بيروت
- Beirut; Lebanon

Information
- Former names: American Boys' School; American Collegiate Institute for Boys; Preparatory School of the American University of Beirut
- Type: Independent school Private school International School
- Motto: Inspire. Grow. Lead.
- Established: 1891; 135 years ago
- Head of School: Tobin I. Wait
- Grades: Nursery to 12th grade
- Enrollment: 3,500+
- Average class size: 24 students
- Language: Arabic; English; French
- Campuses: Ras Beirut; Ain A'ar
- Color: Green White
- Song: Alma Mater
- Athletics: Soccer, Basketball, Golf, Tennis, Archery, Swimming, Volleyball, Track and Field, Badminton, Gymnastics, Pickleball
- Mascot: Cougar
- Accreditation: New England Association of Schools and Colleges; Council of International Schools; International Baccalaureate; Agency for French Education Abroad
- Newspaper: Inside IC
- Yearbook: Torch
- Tuition: ±$9,500-$14,000
- Website: ic.edu.lb

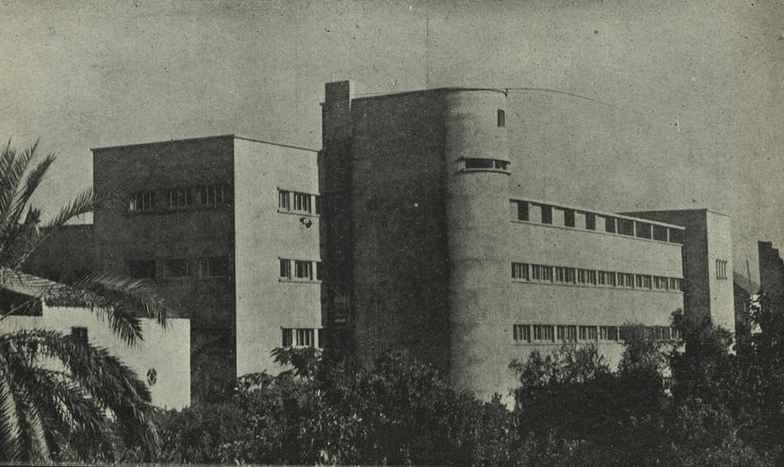
International College, Beirut in 1947

International College (Arabic: الكلية الدولية في بيروت) is an independent non-profit international school in Beirut, Lebanon. Its students come from all over Lebanon, as well as the Middle East and around the world. With two campuses, one in the Lebanese capital Beirut and the other in the urban hillsides (Ain A'ar), the school educates over 3,500 students each year. The school was established in 1891 and is chartered in Massachusetts, United States.

== History ==
The International College was founded in Smyrna, Ottoman Empire in 1891, by Alexander MacLachlan, a Canadian educator, as the American Boys’ School. The first class of five students graduated in 1895, and it was renamed the American Collegiate Institute for Boys.

In 1913, IC opened an elementary school, and added the French language Section Secondaire in 1926.

In 1936, Dr. Bayard Dodge of the American University of Beirut invited IC to come to Beirut and affiliate with AUB as its preparatory school. As a result, IC was known for many years as "The Prep." During its first year in Beirut, IC had 901 students from 37 countries representing 16 religious sects. IC had students from all over the Middle East, who came as boarders living in Thomson and Sage Halls.

IC separated from AUB in the 1960s, naming a separate board of trustees and admitted women to become a co-educational institution.

During the Lebanese Civil War under the leadership of Dr. Alton Reynolds, students and teachers of all religious sects continued to attend classes in Ras Beirut. It evolved to become a leading institution of education in the Middle East with the inspiration of some exemplary Directors such as Mr. Sadik Umar and Mr. Elie Kurban.

In 1988, a satellite campus was constructed in Ain A’ar, far from Beirut, to accommodate the children of alumni in that area. The Ain A’ar campus continues to serve students from pre-school through middle school.

In 1997, IC achieved dual accreditation by the Council of International Schools (CIS) and the New England Association of Schools and Colleges (NEASC).

== Schools ==
All content is taught using the target languages of Arabic, English and French and works within the PYP curricular framework.

The Elementary School covers grades one through five (ages six to eleven). The medium of instruction is either English or French, although Arabic is mandatory for all students. An Arabic program is made available in IC to students who have lived abroad and qualify for exemption from the regular programs.

The Middle School is a four-year cycle covering grades 6 through 9. It offers three programs: the Lebanese Program prepares students for the official Lebanese Brevet examination; the College Preparatory Program is an English medium non-Brevet program; and the French Program is non-Brevet program taught in French that prepares the student for the official French Baccalaureate examination. All programs require the teaching of Arabic, English, French, Mathematics, Science, Social Studies, Physical Education, Arts, Information Technology (IT), Music and Theatre Courses. Grades 6,7, and 8 also receive Technology instruction.

The Secondary School is a three-year cycle made up of four separate programs: The Lebanese Baccalaureate Program which follows a curriculum set by the Lebanese Ministry of Education; The French Baccalaureate Program which follows a curriculum set by the French Ministry of Education; the International Baccalaureate (IB) Diploma Program; and The American College Preparatory Program (CPP), a non-baccalaureate diploma program.

IC's Ain A'ar campus holds two schools. The Lower School for students from nursery to Grade 3 and the Upper School for students from Grade 4 to Grade 9 inclusive. Both Ain Aar schools follow the same curriculum as applied in the Ras Beirut campus.

== High school programs ==
The Lebanese Baccalaureate Program, which follows a curriculum set by the Lebanese Ministry of Education, is available to all students in either an English or French track for core subjects including math and sciences. In the French track, English is taught as a third language and vice versa. In both tracks, Social Studies, History, Geography, Civics, Sociology and Economics, are taught in Arabic with the study of Arabic literature and language mandatory. In the second year, students chose a focus in humanities or sciences, and specialize in the third year.

The French Baccalaureate Program, which follows a curriculum set by the French Ministry of Education, is designed to meet the needs of foreign and Lebanese students who wish to pursue the French Baccalaureate. All core subjects are taught in French. Upon successful completion of the Lebanese or French Baccalaureate program, students are eligible to enter at the sophomore level in all Lebanese and many European and North American universities. Some students pursue both the Lebanese and French Baccalaureate simultaneously. See Secondary education in France.

The International Baccalaureate Program is a two-year curriculum with an assessment component. The IB diploma is recognized by universities around the world. Students admitted to the IB program must hold a second nationality in addition to Lebanese, or must obtain an exemption from the Lebanese official program allowing them to engage in a non-Lebanese program. A good knowledge of English is a prerequisite as it is the language of instruction and also a school average of around a 79.

The American Program is a two-year curriculum designed on the American High school System. Students admitted into this program must hold a foreign passport. Courses taken are extensive and rigorous. Calculus, micro and macroeconomics, and worldwide literature are some of the things taught in courses such as Math, Biology, Economics, Global Issues, English, Arabic, French, Art, Music, Physical Education, and History.

== Civic Engagement and Service Learning Program ==
Participation in the CCSL is mandatory for all IC High School students. Students select two community projects per year, ranging from helping to raise awareness of environmental issues, volunteer at orphanages, and centers for the aged, infirmed and disabled.

== Notable alumni ==
- Constantin Zureiq, Syrian intellectual and pioneer of Arab nationalism
- Ghassan Tueni, Lebanese MP; founder and publisher of the daily newspaper An Nahar
- Basil Fuleihan, Lebanese Minister of Economy and Trade (2000–2003)
- Walid Jumblatt, Lebanese politician and leader of the Lebanese Druze
- Adil Osseiran, Lebanese independence figure and parliament speaker (1953–1959)
- Salim Hoss, Prime Minister of Lebanon (1976–1980; 1987–1990; 1998–2000)
- Sobhi Mahmassani, legal scholar, Lebanese member of parliament and Minister of National Economy (1966–1968)
- Saeb Jaroudi, Lebanese Minister of National Economy, Industry, and Tourism (1970–1972); founding chairman of the Arab Fund for Social and Economic Development
- Saeb Salam, Prime Minister of Lebanon (1952; 1953; 1960–1961; 1970–1973)
- İhsan Doğramacı, Turkish physician, educationalist, chair of UNICEF (1968–1970) and founder of Bilkent University
- Yassine Jaber, Shia Lebanese MP; Minister of Economy (1996–1998)
- David Ramadan, American politician; member of the Virginia House of Delegates (2012–2016)
- Nawaf Salam, current Prime Minister of Lebanon, Ambassador of Lebanon to the United Nations (2007–2017) and Judge of the International Court of Justice (2017–2024); President of the International Court of Justice (2024–2025)
- Guy Béart, French singer and songwriter
- Ali Jaber, Lebanese journalist and Arab Media pioneer, MBC Group TV Director, Dean of Mohammad Bin Rashid School Of Communications at American University in Dubai
- Ali Al-Naimi, Saudi Arabian Minister of Petroleum and Mineral Resources (1995-2016), President of Saudi Aramco (1983-1995)

== Honors ==
IC is the first green school building with LEED gold certification in Lebanon and the Middle East.

== See also ==
- Education in the Ottoman Empire
