= Sobhi Mahmassani =

Lebanese legal scholar (1909–1986)

Sobhi R. Mahmassani

Member of the Parliament of Lebanon
- In office 1964–unknown

Minister of Economy
- In office 1966–1968

Personal details
- Born: 29 January 1909 Beirut, Beirut Vilayet, Ottoman Empire
- Died: 10 September 1986 (aged 77)
- Spouse: Ismat Abdul Kader Inkidar
- Children: 4
- Education: American University of Beirut; University of Lyon; University of London

Sobhi R. Mahmassani (Arabic: صبحي محمصاني, January 29, 1909 – September 10, 1986) was a Lebanese legal scholar, practising lawyer, judge, and political figure helped to build the legal and civic foundations of the then-nascent country of Lebanon, and whose writings on Islamic jurisprudence remain authoritative works on this topic for legal scholars and researchers.

== Personal life ==
Mahmassani was born in Beirut, Lebanon to Rajab Mahmassani and Aisha Khoja. He and his three male and five female siblings pursued higher education. In 1940, he married Ismat Abdul Kader Inkidar, with whom he had four sons: Ghaleb (1941), Malek (1944), Maher (1947) and Hani (1956).

With the onset of the Lebanese Civil War in 1975, Mahmassani struggled to maintain his professional activities in Lebanon and overseas as a legal consultant and international arbitrator. After 1983 his activities slowed down as he was diagnosed with lung cancer, of which he died in Paris, where he was pursuing medical treatment, on September 10, 1986.

== Education ==
Mahmassani commenced primary and high school education in Beirut during World War I at the Preparatory School of the Syrian Evangelical College (now known as International College), a preparatory school for the American University of Beirut. He graduated from the high school in 1924 with high marks, and was designated valedictorian of his class.

He pursued legal studies at the law school of University of Lyon in France from which he graduated with a License en Droit (law degree) followed by a doctorate in law in 1932. He joined the school of law of the London University and obtained bachelors in law degree in English law in 1935. As a result, he was well-versed in both French (Latin) and Anglo-Saxon legal traditions.

Mahmassani was fluent in Arabic, English and French; he also had a reading knowledge of German.

== Legal career ==
Mahmassani started his judicial career in 1929, during the French Mandate over Lebanon, as a court clerk while he was still pursuing his higher education. He served as judge at progressively higher ranks in various locations of Lebanon until he became counselor at the mixed court of appeals in Beirut (in that period, higher courts were presided by French judges). Following the independence of Lebanon, Mahmassani became president of the civil chamber of the court of appeals and cassation of Beirut, the then highest judicial instance in the country.

Mahmassani took early retirement from his judicial career toward the end of 1946 to start a professional career as a lawyer.

In early 1947, Mahmassani founded a law firm in Beirut and became an attorney. That career continued until his death in 1986. During that period, Mahmassani was appointed to lead a number of international arbitrations, some in highly visible cases.

== Public life and political career ==
The Mahmassani family is noted for its contributions to public life. On May 6, 1916 (Martyrs' Day), Sobhi's first cousins Mohammad and Mahmoud Mahmassani were publicly executed in what is now called Martyrs' Square, Beirut by Jamal Pasha, the Ottoman wāli of Greater Syria, because of their nationalist activities.

In 1944, Mahmassani was appointed as member of the Lebanese delegation to the founding of the Arab League in Alexandria, Egypt, in the capacity of legal advisor.

In 1945, he was appointed as member of the Lebanese delegation to the founding of the United Nations in San Francisco, USA, in the capacity of legal advisor. His role was recognized in a 2013 exhibition at the American University of Beirut. Mahmassani contributed to the modernization of Lebanese legislation and the creation of state institutions through his participation in the higher committee appointed for that purpose by President Fuad Chehab upon his election as President of the Republic in 1958. In the 1964 Lebanese general election, Mahmassani was elected to a four-year term as member of the Lebanese Parliament representing the capital city Beirut. He did not seek re-election.

In 1966, he was appointed minister of national economy in the Lebanese government presided by Abdallah El-Yafi, a position he occupied until 1968.

== Academic career ==
In parallel with his professional legal and political careers, Mahmassani had an academic career that spanned from the late 1930s to the late 1970s.

He joined the faculty of the American University of Beirut in 1936 and continued until 1964; over which period he taught several courses, namely Roman law, the laws of the Arab countries and Islamic law.

Around the same time, Mahmassani also joined the faculty of the law school of Saint Joseph University in Beirut where he taught the comparative legal systems of the Arab countries.

Mahmassani was a founder of the Lebanese University and its law school in the early 1960s; he was thus among its first professors teaching Islamic law.

Mahmassani also joined the faculty of the law school of the Beirut Arab University when it opened its doors in Beirut.

Finally, Mahmassani taught law courses at the Military Academy in Lebanon. During a certain period, Mahmassani was lecturing at five universities.

As part of his academic career, Mahmassani visited a number of countries to give lectures as a visiting professor (such as in the US, the Netherlands, Egypt, Pakistan, Iran, Tunisia) or as participant in international conferences (such as in the US, France, Italy, Egypt, Iraq). In particular, in the summer of 1966, he gave a series of lectures at the Hague Academy of International Law on International law and relations in Islam.

He was elected as a Member of the Arab Academies of Damascus, Cairo and Baghdad.

As a scholar of Islamic law, Mahmassani was noted for being open-minded towards other cultures and faiths, and is frequently quoted in discussions of Liberal Islam. He actively participated in international conferences on cultural exchanges and inter-faith dialogue. Most notable were his participation in the UNESCO conferences in Florence, Italy (1950) and Paris, France (1953); the Colloquium on Islamic Culture in Princeton, US (September 1953); the conferences on Muslim - Christian cooperation in Tehran, Iran (1957) and Bhamdoun, Lebanon (1954).

Citations to his work appear in many scholarly books and articles on Islamic law, e.g. Shari_a: Islamic Law in the Contemporary Context, Islam in Transition, Muslim Perspectives, and J. Schacht's An Introduction to Islamic Law. His work on the legal aspects of human rights, from the perspective of different legal systems, is a source for scholars of international affairs. In a review, published in the Bulletin of the School of Oriental and African Studies, of the first English translation of Mahmassani’s classic reference Falsafat Al-Tashri' Fi Al-Islām, The Philosophy of Jurisprudence in Islam (translated into English by Farhat Ziadeh), Anderson refers to Mahmassani as a "leading Lebanese lawyer of the modern school", stating "Professor Mahmassani has … a wide knowledge both of European and Islamic law; he has provided a number of admirable examples of such phenomena as changes in the law authored by early Caliphs or approved by classical jurists; his statements are well-documented; and his remarks…-and indeed most of his summary of the law of evidence are admirable."

A number of honours have been awarded to Mahmassani in Lebanon and abroad in recognition of his contributions. Upon his passing in 1986, he was posthumously awarded the National Order of the Cedar by the President of Lebanon.

Several obituaries and testimonials highlighting Mahmassani's influence as a legal scholar have appeared in Arabic publications; an English language biographical note appears in the Middle East Commercial Law Review. A 25th Anniversary obituary was published (in Arabic) in the Al Liwaa newspaper.

== Publications ==
Mahmassani authored books in Islamic law. A complete list of his books is included below. Their availability in libraries around the world is listed in WorldCat, which identifies 81 works in 160 publications in 7 languages and 645 library holdings. He also wrote articles in newspapers, magazines, and specialized periodicals, some of which are listed below.

Books

- Les Idées Economiques d'Ibn Khaldoun (The Economic Thought of Ibn Khaldoun), BOSC Frères, M. et L. RIOU, Lyon 1932.
- Falsafat Al-Tashri' Fi Al-Islām (The Philosophy of Jurisprudence in Islam), Dar Al 'Ilm Lil Malayeen, Beirut, 1946. This book was translated into Urdu, Lahore, 1955 and into Persian, Tehran, 1968.
- Falsafat Al-Tashri' Fi Al-Islām, The Philosophy of Jurisprudence in Islam, Leiden, E.J. Brill, 1961, translated into English by Farhat Ziadeh.
- Al-Naḍhariyya al-'Āmmah lil Mūjibāt wal 'Uqūd fi al-Sharīa'a al-Islāmiyya (The General Theory of the Law of Obligations and Contracts under Islamic Jurisprudence), Dar Al 'Ilm Lil Malayeen, Beirut, 1948. This book was translated into Persian, Tehran, 1961.
- Al-Dustūr wa al-Dimuqrāṭiyya (The Constitution and Democracy), Beirut 1952.
- Al-Mabādi' al-Shari'iyya wal Qānūniyya fil Ḥajr wa al-Nafaqāt wal Mawāreeth wal waṣiyya (Principles of Islamic Law Relating to Incapacity, Alimony, Inheritance and Wills), Dar Al 'Ilm Lil Malayeen, Beirut, 1954.
- Al-Awdā'a al-Tashrī'iyya Fi al-Duwal al-'Arabiyya: Māḍeeha wa Ḥāḍiruha (Legal Systems in the Arab States: Past and Present), Dar Al 'Ilm Lil Malayeen, Beirut, 1957.
- Muqaddima fī Iḥyā' 'Ulūm al-Sharīa'a (Introduction to Islamic Legal Studies), Dar Al 'Ilm Lil Malayeen, Beirut, 1962.
- The Principles of International Law in the Light of Islamic Doctrine, publications of The Hague Academy of International Law, Leiden, 1966 (extract from "Recueil des Cours", Volume 1).
- Al-Qānūn wal 'Alāqāt al-Dawliyya fil Islām (International Law and Relations in Islam), Dar Al 'Ilm Lil Malayeen, Beirut, 1972.
- Al-Da'ā'im al-Ḳhuluqiyya lil Qawāneen al-Shari'iyya (The Moral Pillars of Islamic Jurisprudence), Dar Al 'Ilm Lil Malayeen, Beirut, 1973.
- Al-Awzā'i wa Ta'āleemuhu al-Insāniyya wal-Qānūniyya (Al-Awza'i and his Humanistic and Legal Teachings) —Dar Al 'Ilm Lil Malayeen], Beirut, 1978.
- Arkān Ḥuqūq al-Insān (Basic Concepts of Human Rights), Dar Al 'Ilm Lil Malayeen, Beirut, 1979.
- Al-Mujāhidūn fil Ḥaqq, Tadhkirāt min Mālek ila al-Sanhūri (Jurists on the Path of Right, from Malek to Sanhoury), Dar Al 'Ilm Lil Malayeen, Beirut, 1979.
- Al-Mujtahidūn fil Qaḍā', Muḳhtārāt min Aqḍiyat al-Salaf (Pioneers of Justice in Islam), Dar Al 'Ilm Lil Malayeen, Beirut, 1980.
- Fī Durūb al-'Adāla, Dirāsāt fi al-Sharīa'a wal Qānūn wal 'Ilāqāt al-Dawliyya (Juristic Trends in Islamic and International Laws), Dar Al 'Ilm Lil Malayeen, Beirut, 1982.
- Turāth al-Ḳhulafā' al-Rāshideen fil-Fiqh wal Qaḍā' (The Legal and Judicial Heritage of the Orthodox Caliphs), Dar Al 'Ilm Lil Malayeen, Beirut, 1984.
- Al-Tarbiya al-Waṭaniyya, a series of school books on civic education, authored in collaboration with professors Shafic Geha and George Shahla, Dar Al 'Ilm Lil Malayeen, Beirut, first published in 1946.

Articles and lectures

- Ibn Qayyim al- Jawziyya wa Nawāḥi a-Tajaddud fī Ijtihādihi (Aspects of Renewal in the Jurisprudence of Ibn Qayyim al-Jawziyya), published in the Review of the Arab Academy of Damascus, Volume 33, pages 363 to 381, 1948.
- Al-Tashrī' al-Lubnani wa Aḥkām al-Waṣiyya al-'Āmma (Provisions Governing Wills in the Lebanese Legislation), published in the Review of the Arab Academy of Damascus, Volume 27, pages 198 to 206, 1952.
- Al-Tashri' al-Islāmi wal Mujtama'a al-Hadīth (Islamic Law and Modernity), a lecture presented in connection with the Arab Studies Conference held at the American University of Beirut in 1951, published with the remaining lectures in Al-'Arab wal Ḥaḍāra al-Ḥadītha, Dar Al 'Ilm Lil Malayeen, Beirut, 1951, page 37.
- The Law and the Modernization of Legal Systems in the Muslim Countries, a lecture given as part of the Colloquium on Islamic Culture in its Relations to the Contemporary World, held in Princeton, September 1953, Princeton University Press 1953.
- Muḥāḍarāt fil Qānūn al-Madani al-Lubnāni, Āṭhār al-Iltizām (Lectures in Lebanese civil Law, the Effects of Obligations), lectures given at the Institute of Higher Arab Studies, Cairo 1953.
- Muslims: Decadence and Renaissance - Adaptation of Islamic Jurisprudence to Modern Social Needs, published in The Muslim World 44 (3-4), 186-2-1, 1954.
- Muḥāḍarāt fil Qānūn al-Madani al-Lubnāni, Intiqāl al-Iltizām (Lectures in Lebanese civil Law, the Transfer of obligations), lectures given at the Institute of Higher Arab Studies, Cairo 1955.
- Transactions in the Shari'ah, published in Law in the Middle East, 1955.
- Muḥāḍarāt fil Qānūn al-Madani al-Lubnāni, Al-Awṣāf al-Mu'addila li Āṭhār al-Iltizām (Lectures in Lebanese civil Law, Circumstances Affecting the Effects of Obligations), lectures given at the Institute of Higher Arab Studies, Cairo 1958.
- Da'āim Aḥkām al-Usra fi al-Shara'a al-Islāmi (The Foundations of Domestic Relations in Islamic Law), published in Travaux et Jours, Volume 4, January/February 1962.
- Qāḍi Quḍāt Baghdad wa Aṭharuhu fī al-Fiqh al-Islāmi (The Supreme Judge of Baghdad and his Contribution to Islamic Jurisprudence), published in the Review of the Arab Academy of Damascus, Volume 40, pages 117 to 136, 1965.
- Al-Jihād wa Musawwiĝhātihi al-Shari'iyya (Jihād and its conditions of Legitimacy), published in the Review of the Arab Academy of Damascus, Volume 44, pages 309 to 322, 1969.
- Adaptation of Islamic Jurisprudence to Modern Social Needs, published in Islam in Transition: Muslim Perspectives (183-185), 1982.
