= Institute of Arabic Manuscripts =

Museum in Egypt

- معهد المخطوطات العربية
- Established: 1946
- Location: Cairo
- Coordinates: 30.048311°N 31.198412°E
- Owner: Arab League

The Institute of Arabic Manuscripts (Arabic: معهد المخطوطات العربية) is an institute dedicated to gathering and indexing Arabic manuscripts. It was founded in 1946 and it is located in Cairo where it is overseen by the Arab League.

It was founded under the name "Institute for the Revival of Manuscripts" معهد إحياء المخطوطات under the Department of Culture of the General Secretariat of the League of Arab States. It later became independent of the Department of Culture in 1955 and became part of the Educational, Cultural and Scientific Organization in the early 1970s. Its first headquarters was in Cairo, where it remained until 1979 when it moved to Tunis where it stayed until the early 1980s when it moved to Kuwait City, where it remained until finally settling in Cairo at the beginning of 1990.

The Institute depended primarily on the work of Carl Brockelmann, particularly his Geschichte der arabischen Litteratur (History of Arabic Literature) in choosing texts, and sent delegations to a number of destinations to gather manuscripts. The Institute also publishes a quarterly journal entitled "Journal of the Institute of Arab Manuscripts" in addition to a periodical publication for news about Arab cultural heritage. It also organizes specialized workshops on issues relating to manuscripts.

== See also ==
- Bibliotheca Alexandrina
