= Saeb N. Jaroudi =

Lebanese minister, banker and economist

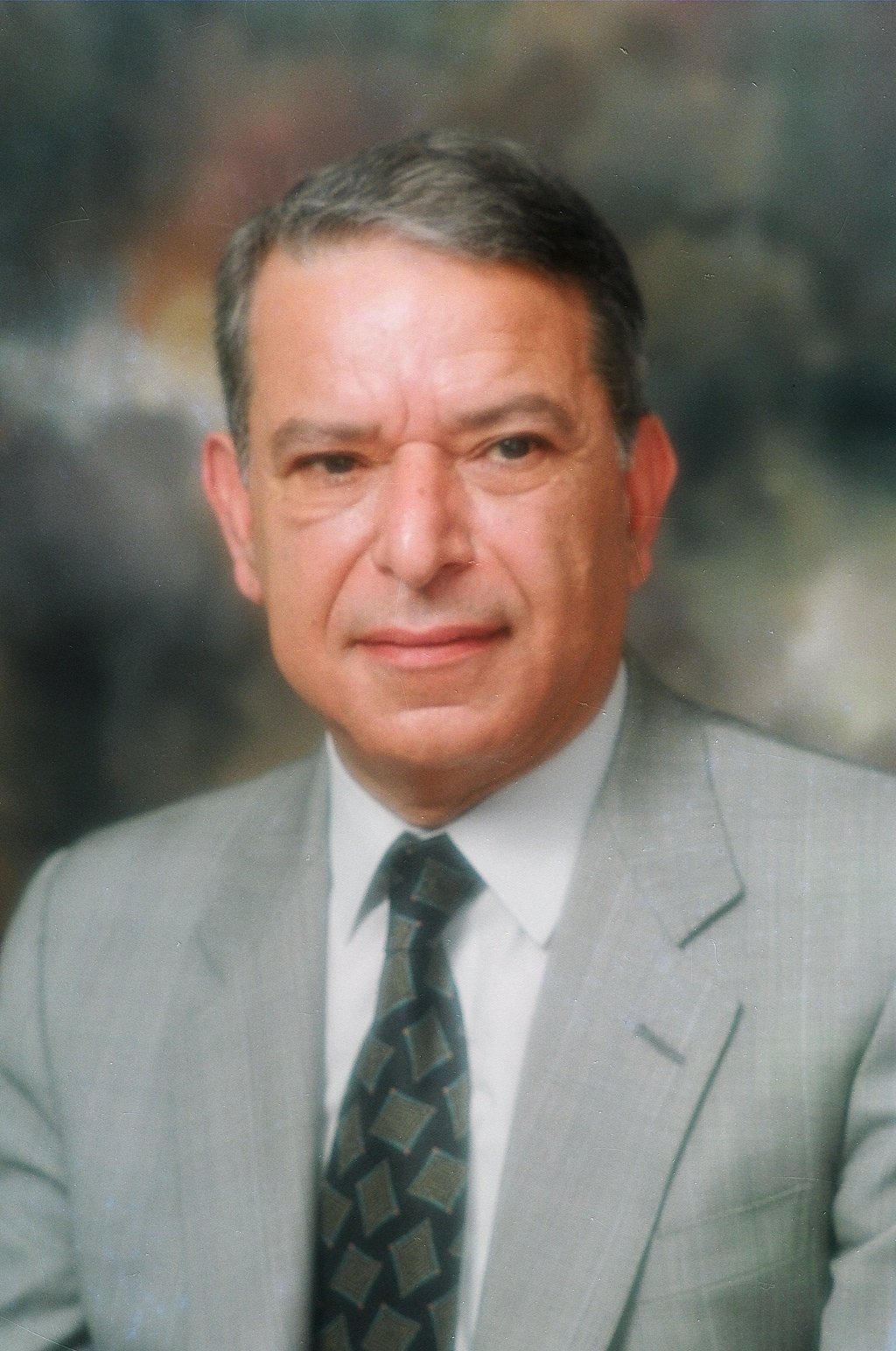
- Jaroudi in 2004
- Born: Saeb Nadim Jaroudi; November 25, 1929; Beirut, Lebanon
- Died: September 14, 2014 (aged 84); Beirut, Lebanon
- Education: Columbia University; University of California, Berkeley
- Occupations: Minister, Banker, Economist
- Spouse: Suad Tawfiq Abul-Huda (Married 1955, Divorced 1955) Leila Salaam (married 1964)
- Children: 2

Saeb N. Jaroudi (Arabic: صائب جارودي) was the former minister of national economy, industry, and tourism in Lebanon and the first chairman of the board and president of the Kuwait-based Arab Fund for Economic and Social Development. He held a number of leadership roles in the Arab world, Europe, and the United States throughout his career.

== Background and education ==
Jaroudi was born into a prominent family from Beirut, Lebanon. He graduated high school from International College, Beirut in 1947 after which he went to study in the United States where he earned Bachelor's and Master's degrees at the University of California, Berkeley and completed his PhD studies at Columbia University.

== Career ==
=== Early Start in Academia ===
Jaroudi began his professional experience teaching economics at the American University of Beirut, where he also participated in the pioneering work of the Economic Research Institute on economic development and business legislation in the Middle East.

=== United Nations Development Programme ===
His strong United Nations ties began when he joined the UN’s Center for Development Planning in New York as a senior economist. During a decade-long UN career, he assisted in the establishment and implementation of several Arab countries’ national development plans. He also assisted the Kuwaiti government in establishing the Kuwait Fund for Arab Economic Development and driving its operations during its early years.

=== Minister of National Economy, Industry, and Tourism ===
From 1970 to 1972, Jaroudi was minister of national economy, industry, and tourism in Saeb Salam's first cabinet during President Suleiman Frangieh's mandate, He introduced policies that successfully stimulated the development of lesser developed regions of the country, encouraged the flow of foreign direct investment into the country and increased exports through bilateral trade agreements. To promote investment in Lebanon’s industrial sector, he developed and led a pioneering matchmaking program with the United Nations Industrial Development Organization (UNIDO), which culminated in the signing of 20 new joint venture projects between Lebanese and foreign investors.

=== Arab Fund for Economic and Social Development ===
In 1972, he was elected as the first chairman of the board and president of the Kuwait-based Arab Fund for Economic and Social Development by the Arab Ministers of Finance. He established the Fund as the regional development bank of the Arab world, initiating and financing major national and inter-country industrial, agriculture, rural development, power, water, education, and healthcare projects. During his tenure, he also initiated the establishment of the Arab Monetary Fund and the Arab Authority for Agricultural Investment and Development.

=== Later career ===
In his later years, Jaroudi served as a senior economic consultant advising international public and private institutions on economic policy and project finance. He served on several boards at LGB Bank, Arab Finance Corporation, The Arab British Centre and the British Lebanese Association, He also served as a member of the Board of Trustees of the Arab British Chamber of Commerce Foundation, and International College, Beirut.

== Honors and recognition ==
In recognition of his contributions to the economic and social advancement of developing countries, Jaroudi was elected as a member of the United Nations Committee for Development Policy and UNESCO’s International Fund for the Promotion of Culture. He was also an elected fellow of The Royal Numismatic Society (RNS), a learned society and charity based in London, United Kingdom whose patron as of 2014 was Queen Elizabeth II.

On September 18, 2014, upon the request of the Lebanese Prime Minister Tammam Salam, he was honored by a minute of silence by the Lebanese Council of Ministers at the start of the cabinet meeting.
