= 1964 Arab League summit (Cairo) =

Meeting of Arab regional organization

Arab League summit
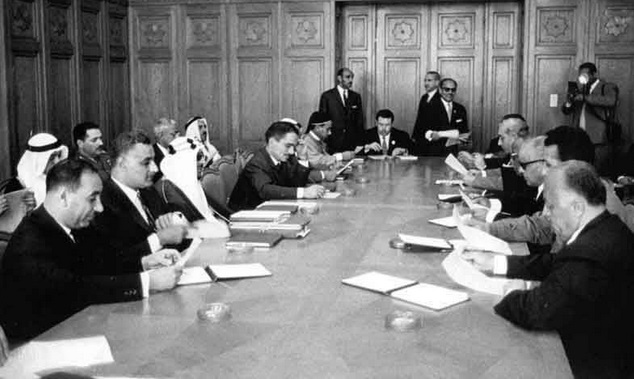
- Arab heads of state in a meeting during the summit
- Host country: Egypt
- Dates: 13 January 1964 – 16 January 1964
- Cities: Cairo

The 1964 Arab League summit was the first summit of the Arab League, held in Cairo, Egypt, on 13–16 January 1964 and attended by all thirteen of the then member states: United Arab Republic (Egypt), Iraq, Lebanon, Syria, Saudi Arabia, Jordan, Yemen Arab Republic, Libya, Sudan, Morocco, Tunisia, Kuwait and Algeria. At the summit, held on the initiative of the United Arab Republic (modern-day Egypt only, following the 1961 secession of Syria from the union), it was decided to carry out planning to resolve inter-Arab conflicts and to adopt common principles regarding opposition to imperialism and, in the words of the summit participants, to what they described as the “aggressive policies” of Israel. The key resolutions from the summit were expanded and recorded in a letter to the United Nations eight months later at the 1964 Arab League summit (Alexandria).

== Background ==
At the time, Syria and Palestinian fedayeen called for a rematch of the 1948 Arab-Israeli War, but other Arab states (most notably Egypt under Gamal Abdel Nasser) felt it was not the right moment to strike. Instead, they agreed on the non-military belligerent tactic of diverting water from the Jordan River so that Israel could not use it. This diversion was called the 1964 Headwater Diversion Plan. It went against the original agreed proposals of the River Jordan by both Israel and the Arabs in the 1955 Unified Johnston Plan, also known as the Jordan Valley Unified Water Plan. This was one of the factors that later precipitated the Six-Day War in 1967.

The immediate catalyst for the summit was Israel's proposed diversion of water from Lake Tiberias. In reaction to Syria's repeated charges of Egyptian reluctance for military confrontation with Israel, Egyptian president Gamal Abdel Nasser (1918–1970) championed an Arab plan to divert two sources of the River Jordan, the Hasbani River and the Banias. Nasser blamed Arab divisions for what he deemed "the disastrous situation". This had been the chosen option out of two proposals of the 1964 Headwater Diversion Plan. On 23 December 1963, he said:

In order to confront Israel, which challenged us last week when its chief-of-staff stood up and said "we shall divert the water against the will of the Arabs and the Arabs can do what they want", a meeting between Arab Kings and Heads of State must take place as soon as possible, regardless of the conflicts and differences between them. Those with whom we are in conflict, we are prepared to meet; those with whom we have a quarrel, we are ready, for the sake of Palestine, to sit with.

== Participants ==
The participants in the meeting were recorded in a letter to the United Nations as follows:

- Jordan: King Hussein of Jordan
- Tunisia: de facto Prime Minister Bahi Ladgham
- Algeria: President Ahmed Ben Bella
- Sudan: President Ibrahim Abboud
- Iraq: President Abdul Salam Arif
- Saudi Arabia: Prince Faisal of Saudi Arabia (later King)
- Syria: President Amin al-Hafiz
- Egypt: President Gamal Abdel Nasser (technically President of the United Arab Republic)
- Yemen Arab Republic (North Yemen) President Abdullah as-Sallal
- Kuwait: Prince Abdullah III Al-Salim Al-Sabah
- Lebanon: President Charles Helou
- Libya: King Idris of Libya
- Morocco: Prince Moulay Abdallah of Morocco
- Palestine: Ahmad Shukeiri

A number of key Arab states had not yet achieved independence from Britain in 1964, and therefore their leaders did not participate in the conference:

- Bahrain: Emir Isa bin Salman Al Khalifa
- Oman: Sultan Said bin Taimur of Muscat and Oman
- Qatar: Emir Ahmad bin Ali Al Thani
- United Arab Emirates: Emirs of the Trucial States
- South Yemen: Sultans of the Federation of South Arabia and the Protectorate of South Arabia

== Resolutions and effects ==
On Palestine, Ahmad al-Shuqayri (1908–1988), a Palestinian diplomat and a former assistant secretary-general of the Arab League (1950–1956), was given a mandate to initiate contacts aimed at establishing a Palestinian entity, in which role he would eventually become first chairman of the Palestine Liberation Organization.

On the military front, Cairo Radio announced that the leaders of the Arab League member states agreed to set up a unified military command, the United Arab Command, to be headed by an Egyptian lieutenant general, Ali Ali Amer, and with headquarters in Cairo. No mention of this new body was made in the official communiqué from the summit, although the secretary-general himself, Abdel Khalek Hassouna, had stated that certain adopted resolutions would remain secret.

On the water diversion plan, all thirteen member states unanimously resolved to approve Nasser's proposal. The effect of the summit and the decisions taken there was to emasculate the Council of the Arab League and supersede it as the foremost decision-making body. Nasser discouraged Syria and Palestinian guerrillas from provoking the Israelis, conceding that he had no plans for war with Israel.

During the summit, Nasser developed cordial relations with King Hussein, and ties were mended with the rulers of Saudi Arabia, Syria, and Morocco. The summit was to be the first of many: in late 1964, a second summit (1964 Arab League summit (Alexandria)) would be held in Alexandria, also in Egypt. Following this second summit, a letter was sent to the United Nations setting out the agreed resolutions.

In Louis-Joseph Lebret (IRFED) diary, who was working for the development of Lebanon, it was noted: The Arab summit of 1964 has just ended. Syria stood alone to defend its point of view of military intervention. Either Nasser is afraid of failure, or he does not want to displease the USA... Lebanon, with its political wisdom, allowed it not to engage. For all except Syria, it was a wise decision. But Israel will not be attacked. Nasser, with his masking smile, tenderly embraced Karamé who was rather embarrassed.

== Bibliography ==
- Aburish, Said K. (2004), Nasser, the Last Arab, New York City: St. Martin's Press, ISBN 978-0-312-28683-5
- Ben-Yehuda, Hemda; Sandler, Shmuel (2002). The Arab-Israeli conflict transformed: fifty years of interstate and ethnic crises. Albany, New York: The State University of New York Press. ISBN 978-0-7914-5245-5.
- Brecher, Michael; Wilkenfeld, Jonathan (1997). A study of crisis. The University of Michigan Press. ISBN 978-0-472-10806-0.
- Dasgupta, Punyapriya (1988). Cheated by the world: the Palestinian experience. New Delhi: Orient Longman Limited. ISBN 978-0-86131-827-8.
- Dawisha, Adeed (2009), Arab Nationalism in the Twentieth Century: From Triumph to Despair, Princeton: Princeton University Press, ISBN 978-0-691-10273-3
- El-Abed, Oroub (2009). Unprotected: Palestinian in Egypt since 1948. Institute for Palestine Studies and International Development Research Centre. ISBN 978-1-55250-443-7.
- Hof, Frederic C. (2000), "The water dimension of Golan Heights negotiations", in Amery, Hussein A.; Wolf, Aaron T. (eds.), Water in the Middle East: a geography of peace, University of Texas Press
- Kalawoun, Nasser Mounif (2000). The struggle for Lebanon: a modern history of Lebanese-Egyptian relations. London: I. B. Tauris and Company. ISBN 978-1-86064-423-8.
- Maddy-Weitzman, Bruce (1993). The crystallization of the Arab state system, 1945 – 1954. Syracuse, New York: Syracuse University Press. ISBN 978-0-8156-2575-9.
- Osmańczyk, Edmund Jan (2003), "Arab conferences, 1944 – 1997", in Mango, Anthony (ed.), Encyclopedia of the United Nations and international agreements, vol. 1 (3 ed.), New York: Routledge
