= Arab Customs Union =

Customs union

Customs unions worldwide

The Arab Customs Union (Arabic: الاتحاد الجمركي العربي) is a customs union announced at the Arab League's 2009 Arab Economic and Social Development Summit in Kuwait in order to achieve a functional customs union by 2015 and an Arab common market by 2020 and to increase inter-Arab trade and integration.

== History ==
The announcement was made by the head of the Arab Customs Union Committee, Saud Al Jefeiri, who recently presided over a two-day meeting of the committee at the Arab League headquarters in Cairo, Egypt.

Participants in the meeting discussed the customs union plan and the structure of the customs union and reviewed the legal structure and regulations for the union. The union will lead to the establishment of an Arab common market.

Al Jefeiri, who represented Qatar at the meeting, said most Arab member countries agreed to put forward an implementing plan, Egypt and Morocco asked for an independent accord to govern the customs union.

The Arab customs union resolution contains 17 chapters and 179 articles regulating economic and trade relationship between Arab countries, and aims to boost trade and investment among member states

- Economic and Social Council (Arab League)
- Gulf Cooperation Council
- Council of Arab Economic Unity (CAEU)
- Federation of Arab Trade Unions and Labor Societies
