= Arab Fund for Economic and Social Development =

Development finance institution

- Emblem

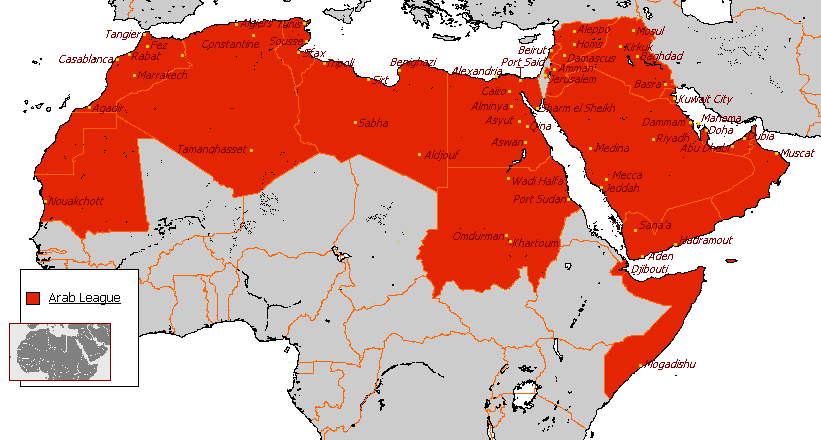
- Map indicating members of the Arab League.
- Headquarters: Kuwait
- Official languages: Arabic
- Type: Development finance institution of the Arab League
- Membership: 21 states: Algeria; Bahrain; Djibouti; Egypt; Iraq; Jordan; Kuwait; Lebanon; Libya; Mauritania; Morocco; Oman; Palestine; Qatar; Saudi Arabia; Somalia; Sudan; Syria; Tunisia; UAE; Yemen

Leaders
  - Chairman: Abdulatif Y. Al-Hamad

Establishment
  - Agreement: 16 May 1968
  - First meeting: 6 February 1972

The Arab Fund for Economic and Social Development (AFESD) (Arabic: الصندوق العربي للإنماء الاقتصادي والاجتماعي), is a Kuwait-based pan-Arab development finance institution. All member-states of the Arab League are members of the AFESD. As of 2003, it held around US$7.3 billion in assets.

The AFESD was established by agreement of the Economic and Social Council of the Arab League. Its first meeting was held on 6 February 1972.

The current Chairman is Bader M. Alsaad.

Founding Chairman is Saeb N. Jaroudi.

== AFESD Purpose ==
The Arab Fund for Economic and Social Development (AFESD) claims its main purpose is “contribute to the financing of economic and social development projects in the Arab countries”(Arab Fund for Economic and Social Development 2024). They execute this through providing financing for development projects, and providing loans to public and private institutions as well as encouraging investments in member states. AFESD also provides economic assistance through expert consultation in various projects.

The AFESD gives priority to Arab countries in the distribution of loans which is one of their main strategies to economic development and promote cooperation for these Arab nations. The fund aims to achieve the best possible regulations of project implementation in order to promote a better approach to development. AFESD works closely with government and regulatory authorities in order to ensure proper implementation and supervision.

The fund focuses on both private and public sector improvements with a priority to inter-Arab projects. Providing loans, expertise and habilitating a means of communication between governments and concerned authorities.

== Governance ==
AFESD is operated by two main committees, the Board of Governors, the Board of Directors which has a chairman. These committees oversee the Support Services Department, the Administrative Affairs Department, the Financial Affairs Department, the Operations Department and the Investment Department, all of which have many smaller units and sections.

Chairman of Board of Directors and General Manager
Name	country
Mr. Bader M. Alsaad	Kuwait

=== About Mr. Bader M. Alsaad ===
Mr. Bader M. Alsaad has been the chairman of the Board of directors and the standing General Manager. He graduated from Kuwait University with a bachelor's degree in accounting. Mr. Alsaad has an extensive history serving in leadership positions at financial institutions around the world.He was previously the CEO of Kuwait Financial Center ‘Markaz’, the leading investment firm in Kuwait from 1997-2003. He has also previously served as a manager in the Kuwait Managing Authority from December 2003 until April 2017. He has also held various positions at the Bank of Kuwait and the Middle East. He is also a founder and former chairman of International forum of Sovereign Wealth Funds.

Mr. Bader M. Alsaad is also currently on the Board of Directors and on the Executive Committee in the Kuwait Investment Authority. Supervisory board of Daimler AG and Daimler Trucks. He is on the Global Advisory Council for the Bank of America and is also notably on the Board of Directors for BlackRock

Members of Board of Directors
Name
Mr. Fouzi Lekjaa
Mr. Musallam Mahad Ali Qatan
Ms. Mariam Al Amiri
Mr. Ahmed Omar El Ghanay
Ms. Ghadeer Hegazi
Mr. Abderrahmane Khiddi
Dr. Fahad Ibrahim A. AlShathri
Mr. Waleed SH. Albahar

Members of the Board of Governors
Name	Country
Dr. Gibril Ibrahim Mohammed	Republic of Sudan
Mr. Laziz Fayed	People's Democratic Republic of Algeria
Ms. Zeina Toukan	Hashemite Kingdom of Jordan
Ms. Nadia Fattah Alaoui	Kingdom of Morocco
Mr. Mohammed Bin Hadi Al Hussaini	State of the United Arab Emirates
Sheikh Salman Bin Khalifa Al-Khalifa	Kingdom of Bahrain
Mr. Ali Bin Ahmed Al Kuwari	State of Qatar
Mr. Mohammed Bin Abdullah Al Jadaan	Kingdom of Saudi Arabia
Mr. Samir Abdelhafidh	Republic of Tunisia
Dr. Khalid Al Mabrouk Abdalla Al Mabrouk	State of Libya
Dr. Rania Al Mashat	Arab Republic of Egypt
Dr. Waed Abdullah Badhib	Republic of Yemen
Mr. Nabil Adnan Al-Jisr	Republic of Lebanon
Eng. Noora Sulaiman Salem Al Fassam	State of Kuwait
Mr. Sidi Ahmed Ould Bouh	The Islamic Republic of Mauritania
Mr. Sultan bin Salem bin Saeed Al-Habsi	Sultanate of Oman
Dr. Wael Zakout	State of Palestine
Mr. Ilyas Moussa Dawaleh	Republic of Djibouti
Mr. Ibrahim Muhammad Abdel Razzaq	Union of the Comoros
Ms. Taif Sami Mohammed	Republic of Iraq
Dr. Kanan Yaghi	Syrian Arab Republic

Alternate Governors
Name	Country
Mr. Marwan Al Rifai	Hashemite Kingdom of Jordan
Mr. Ayman Mohammed Al-Sayari	Kingdom of Saudi Arabia
Mr. Ahmed Kojak	Arab Republic of Egypt
Ms. Wazira Mohammed Ahmed Al Sharmani	Republic of Yemen
Mr. Waleed S. Al-Bahar	State of Kuwait
Mr. Khaled Mohamed Balama	State of the United Arab Emirates
Mr. Yousif Abdulla Humood	Kingdom of Bahrain
Mr. Nasser Qatami	State of Palestine
Mr. Fouzi Lekjaa	Kingdom of Morocco
Mr. Mohamed Salem Ould Al Nani	The Islamic Republic of Mauritania
Mr. Sadeq Hweidi Abbas	Republic of Iraq
