= Isa bin Rashid Al Khalifa =

Bahraini poet (1938–2020)

- عيسى بن راشد آل خليفة
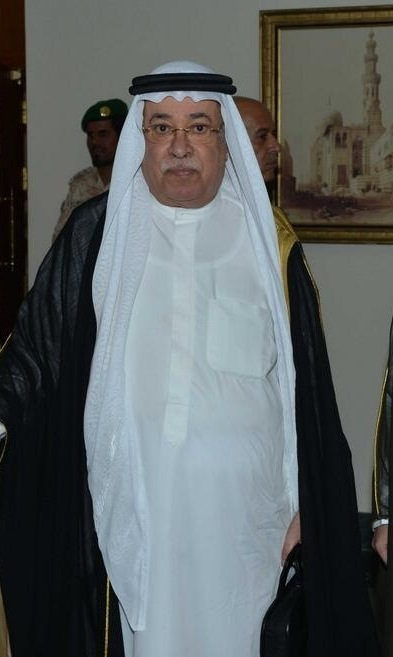
- Isa bin Rashid Al Khalifa
- Born: Isa bin Rashid bin Abdullah bin Isa bin Ali bin Khalifa bin Salman bin Ahmed Al-Fateh bin Mohammed Al Khalifa; January 1, 1938; Muharraq, Bahrain
- Died: March 20, 2020 (aged 82); Riffa, Bahrain
- Occupation(s): poet, Cabinet official, sports administrator

Sheikh Isa bin Rashid bin Abdullah bin Isa bin Ali bin Khalifa bin Salman bin Ahmed Al-Fateh bin Mohammed Al Khalifa (Arabic: الشيخ عيسى بن راشد بن عبد الله بن عيسى بن علي بن خليفة بن سلمان بن أحمد الفاتح بن محمد آل خليفة; January 1, 1938 – March 12, 2020) was a Bahraini poet. Born in Muharraq, he moved to Riffa and lived there for most of his life. He died after a struggle with illness.

== early admin career ==
Al Khalifa held several leadership positions in the sports field, starting with the presidency of Bahrain SC. He was the longest-serving president of the Bahrain Football Association from 1974 to 1988 and chaired the Board of Directors of the Bahrain Olympic Committee at the latter's establishment in 1979. He also served as a minister in the Cabinet of Bahrain for the General Organization for Youth and Sports and was vice-president of the Supreme Council for Youth and Sports from 1999 until his death in 2020.

== Sports administration offices ==
- President, Bahrain SC
- Chairman of the Board of Directors, Bahrain Olympic Committee
- President, Bahrain Football Association
- Vice-president and Chairman of the Media and Marketing Committees, Member of International Relation Committee, Union of Arab National Olympic Committees
- Vice-president, Chairman of the Media Committee, Member of International Relation Committee, Union of Arab Football Associations
- Member, International Olympic Committee Court of Arbitration for Sport
- Vice-president for West Asia, Olympic Council of Asia

== Outside of sports ==
He worked in the Ministry of Defense and the national judiciary. Among his offices were Undersecretary of Defense, Undersecretary of Information, vice-president of the Supreme Council for Youth and Sports, and President of the General Organization for Youth and Sports.

== Personal life ==
His mother is Sheikha Maryam bint Shafi bin Salem Al Shafi, daughter of the Emir of the Shaml Al-Hawajer tribe. His wife is Sheikha bint Salman Al Khalifa, daughter of Bahraini monarch Salman bin Hamad Al Khalifa I. They had two sons, Sheikh Abdullah bin Isa and Sheikh Salman bin Isa Al Khalifa.

== Poetry ==
A pioneering poet and lyricist, his poems include the following:

- فـيٌ العصر ("In the Afternoon")
- يالزينة ذكريني ("Remind Me, Darling")
- مرار خلاني الدهر ("Bitterness Made Me Eternal")
- مريت مرار ("Passed by Bitterness")
- يا كثر ما تسئلين ("You Often Ask")
- انا شرهان يا عمري ("I Am Sharhan, My Life")
- الغيرة طبع فيني ("Jealousy Printed Fini")
- أحبك هذا حظي ("I Love You, This Is My Luck")
- قاعد يطق إصبع ("Seated Finger")
- ما حبني مره ("He Never Loved Me")
- تسألني مكتوب الهوى ("Ask Me Your Written Fancy")
- عيدك مبارك ("Eid Mubarak")
- (ش) الدنيا فيكم ("(You) The World Is Among You")
- ليت العمر ينشره ("Inshalla the Age Shall Be Published")
- كل عيوب الدنيا فيك ("All the Faults of This World Are in You")
- هذي أنتي ("Is That You?")
- أطري عليكم يالربع ("The Neighborhood Praises You")
- أرجوك لا ترجع ("Please Don't Come Back")
- ليله ذكرتك ("The Night I Reminded You")
- ما هقوتي ("What a Hell")
- فريتچ ("Fritch")
- صرت أتذكركم غصب ("I Remember You from Rage")
- لا تسأليني بعد. ("Don't Ask Me Yet")
- سلام من قلبي لكم ("Peace from My Heart to You")
- ساكن في قلبي ("Live in My Heart")
- بعده شوقك في عيونك ("You Long after Him in Your Eyes")
- أحب اللي تحبون ("I Love What You Love")
- مره جرحني ("He Once Hurt Me")
- نسلي البسايل ("Generation Al-Basayl")
- دعيت عليك من قلبي ("I Invited You from My Heart")
- يا ديرتي تطرين ("Oh, My Dear Tretrin")
- ولهان يا محرق ("And for Me, O Muharraq")
- يومين مَرو علي ("Two Days Passed by Me")
- عطني يدك ("Give Me Your Hand")
- ولا تاب ("He Does Not Repent")
- أكذب على الناس ("I Lie to People")
- خليجنا دار الكرم ("Our Harbor is the Abode of Generosity")
- بالمحبوب فايز ("Beloved Faiz")
