= 1964 Arab League summit (Alexandria) =

Meeting of Arab regional organization

Second Arab League summit
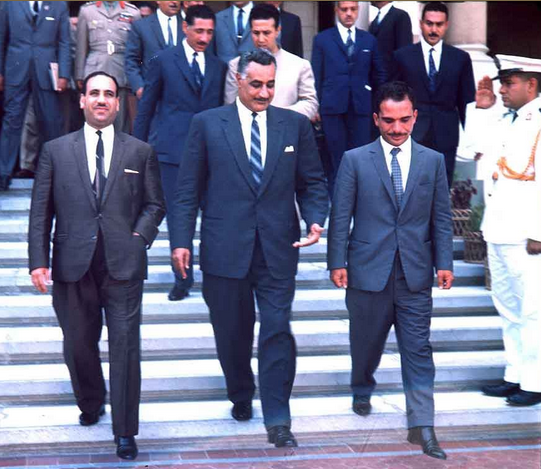
- Arab heads of state arriving in Alexandria. Front row, left to right: Abdul Salam Arif of Iraq, Gamal Abdel Nasser of Egypt, Hussein of Jordan. Behind them left to right: Abdel Hakim Amer of the Egyptian Army and Ahmed Ben Bella of Algeria
- Host country: United Arab Republic (Egypt)
- Date: 5–11 September 1964
- Cities: Alexandria

The 1964 Arab League summit in Alexandria was held on 5–11 September 1964 in Montaza Palace, Alexandria as the second Arab League Summit. The focus of the conference was to implement the plans discussed at the first Arab League summit held in January of that year. The summit was notable for being a key step in the buildup to the Six-Day War in 1967 and separately for "approving the establishment of the Palestine Liberation Organization." The conference endorsed the proposal by Syrian President Amin al-Hafiz to draft a detailed plan for liberating Israel-controlled territories, notwithstanding reservations expressed by leaders like Abdel Nasser concerning the imperative of upgrading defensive capabilities. They also expressed their determination to end British colonialism in Yemen and Oman.

== Background ==
The 1964 Arab League summit (Cairo) was against the background of the 1961 breakup of the United Arab Republic of Egypt and Syria, the continued control of the Gaza Strip by Egypt and the West Bank by Jordan following the 1948 Arab–Israeli War and the recent tensions in the region driven by Israel's proposed diversion of water from Lake Tiberias. The January 1964 summit in Cairo was convened following a statement by Egyptian president Gamal Abdel Nasser on 23 December 1963: "In order to confront Israel, which challenged us last week when its chief-of-staff stood up and said "we shall divert the water against the will of the Arabs and the Arabs can do what they want", a meeting between Arab kings and Heads of State must take place as soon as possible, regardless of the conflicts and differences between them. Those with whom we are in conflict, we are prepared to meet; those with whom we have a quarrel, we are ready, for the sake of Palestine, to sit with."

== Resolutions ==
The council made a number of resolutions, principally relating to Palestine and Arab unity. These resolutions included statements that the Council:

- Was unanimous in defining national objectives for the liberation of Palestine from Zionist colonialism and in committing itself to a plan for joint Arab action both in the present stage for which plans have been made, and in the following stage.
- Stressed the necessity of utilizing all Arab potentialities, and the mobilization of their resources and capabilities, in order to counter the challenge of colonialism and Zionism as well as Israel’s continued aggressive policies and its insistence on denying the rights of the Arabs of Palestine to their homeland.
- Adopted resolutions for the implementation of Arab plans, especially in the technical and military fields, including embarking on immediate work on projects for the exploitation of the waters of the River Jordan and its tributaries.
- Welcomed the establishment of the Palestine Liberation Organization to consolidate the Palestine Entity, and as a vanguard for the collective Arab struggle for the liberation of Palestine. It approved the Organization's decision to establish a Palestinian Liberation Army and defined the commitments of the member States to assist it in its work.
- Expressed its appreciation for the support given by foreign countries to Arab causes in general and the Palestine cause in particular.
- Resolved to combat British imperialism in the Arab Peninsula and to provide assistance to the liberation movement in the Occupied South and Oman.
- Devoted attention to consolidating Arab friendly relations with the emirates of the Persian Gulf area to ensure the indivisible Arab freedom and to realize common interests.
- Discussed means of consolidating unified Arab political, defence, economic and social action within the framework of the Arab League.
- Placed special emphasis on the promotion of Arab economic co-operation and the implementation of all economic agreements since economic unity is the basic foundation on which Arab power and progress rests and the strongest bastion against foreign challenge. This, in addition to the fact that such unity is the primary objective of contemporary international groupings.
- Stressed the necessity of stepping up co-operation and increasing the economic support to the States of the Arab Maghreb.
- Agreed to form a joint Arab Council to undertake nuclear research for peaceful uses and to set up an Arab court of justice.

== Participants ==
The participants in the meeting were recorded in a letter to the United Nations as follows:

- Jordan: King Hussein of Jordan
- Tunisia: de facto Prime Minister Bahi Ladgham
- Algeria: President Ahmed Ben Bella
- Sudan: President Ibrahim Abboud
- Iraq: President Abdul Salam Arif
- Saudi Arabia: Prince Faisal of Saudi Arabia (later King)
- Syria: President Amin al-Hafiz
- Egypt: President Gamal Abdel Nasser (technically President of the United Arab Republic)
- Yemen: President Abdullah as-Sallal (Yemen Arab Republic)
- Kuwait: Prince Abdullah III Al-Salim Al-Sabah
- Lebanon: President Charles Helou
- Libya: King Idris of Libya
- Morocco: Prince Moulay Abdallah of Morocco
- Palestine: Ahmad Shukeiri

A number of key Arab states had not yet achieved independence from Britain in 1964, and therefore their leaders did not participate in the conference:

- Bahrain: Emir Isa bin Salman Al Khalifa
- Oman: Sultan Said bin Taimur of Muscat and Oman
- Qatar: Emir Ahmad bin Ali Al Thani
- United Arab Emirates: Emirs of the Trucial States
- South Yemen: Sultans of the Federation of South Arabia and the Protectorate of South Arabia
