= Arab League Educational, Cultural and Scientific Organization =

International cultural organization

- المنظمة العربية للتربية والثقافة والعلوم

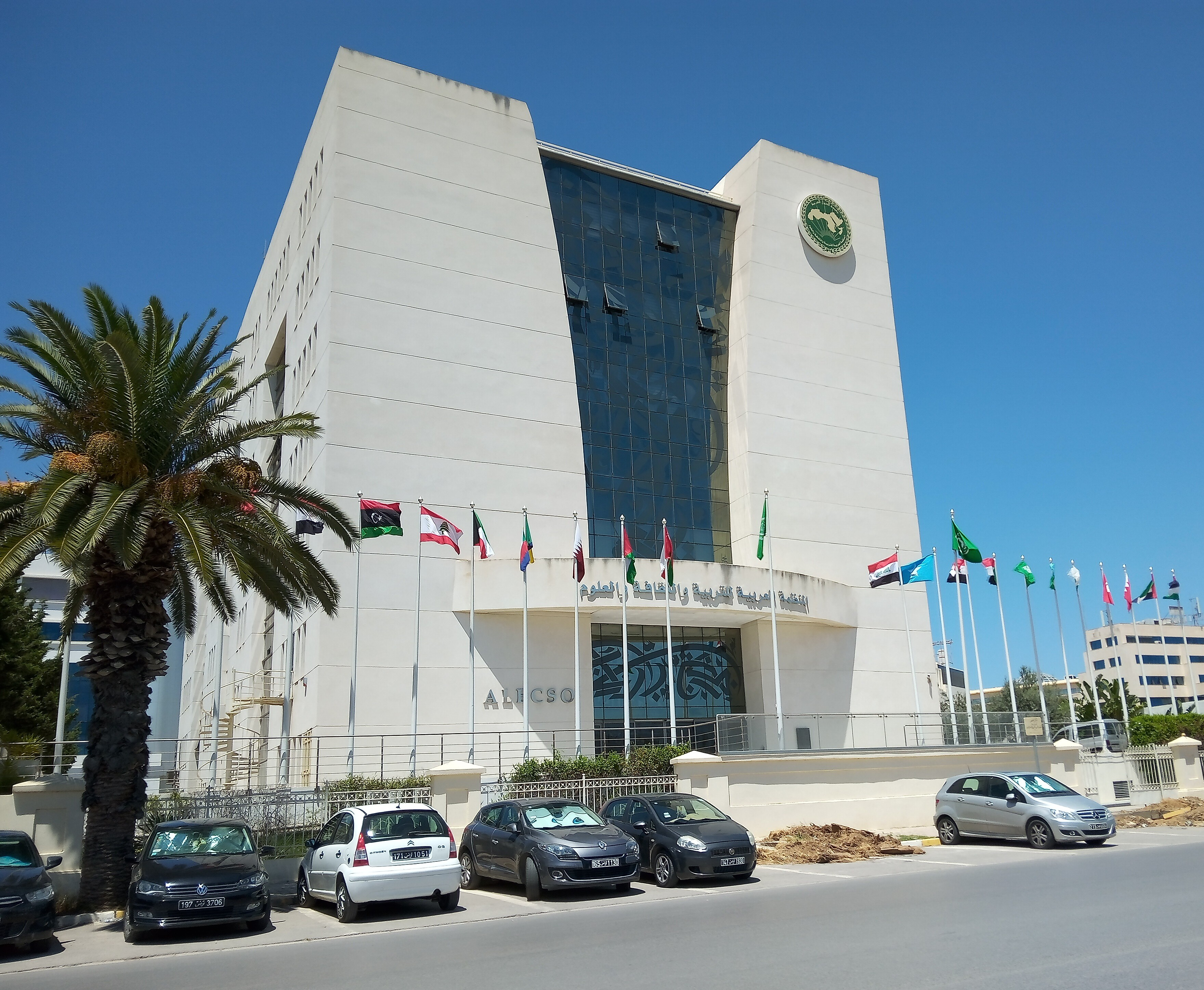
- ALECSO headquarters in Tunis

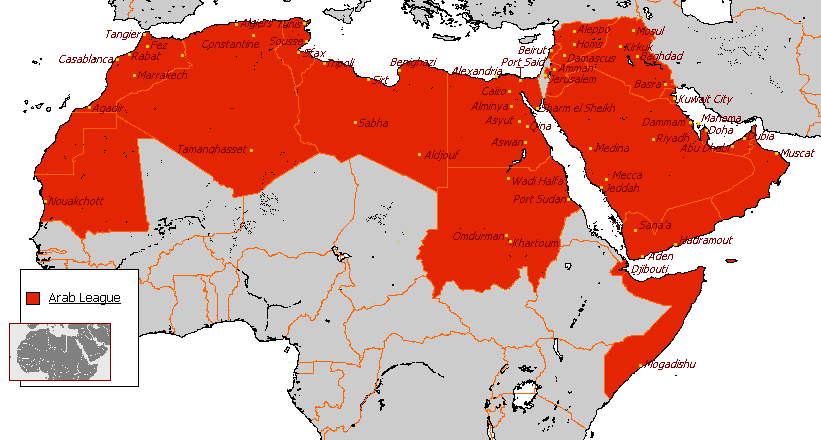
- Map of the Arab League
- Formation: 25 July 1970
- Type: Arab League institution
- Headquarters: Tunis, Tunisia
- Official language: Arabic
- Leader: Saud Hilal Al-Harbi
- Main organ: Conference of Arab Education Ministers
- Parent organization: Arab League
- Website: www.alecso.org/site

The Arab League Educational, Cultural and Scientific Organization (ALECSO) (Arabic: المنظمة العربية للتربية والثقافة والعلوم) is a Tunis-based institution of the Arab League, established in accordance with article 3 of the Arab Cultural Unity Charter by an announcement made in Cairo, Egypt, on 25 July 1970. ALECSO aims to coordinate cultural and educational activities in the Arab world.

Among its various activities, subsidiary ALECSO institutions have been established across the Arab world:

- Arab Centre for Arabization, Translation, Authorship and Publication
- Arabization Coordination Bureau
- Institute of Arabic Manuscripts
- Institute of Arab Research and Studies
- International Institute for the Arabic Language

== Activities ==
Article 1 of ALECSO's constitution states that ALECSO seeks to achieve unity of thought in the Arab world through education, culture and science and to enhance the level of culture in the region, in order to keep up with and contribute to universal civilisation.

=== Arab Centre for Arabization, Translation, Authorship and Publication ===
ACATAP logo

The Arab Centre for Arabization, Translation, Authorship and Publication (ACATAP) is a Damascus-based institution, established in 1990 by an agreement between Syria and ALECSO. In pursuit of the goals of the Arabic Cultural Unity Charter and the ALECSO constitution, ACATAP aims to Arabize higher education in the Arab world, enrich Arab culture through the translation of works of foreign origin and share Arab achievements through the translation of Arabic works in the fields of science, art and literature into widely spoken foreign languages. The current director of ACATAP is Zaid Ibraheem Al Assaf.

=== Institute of Arab Research and Studies ===
The Institute of Arab Research and Studies (IARS) (Arabic: معهد البحوث والدراســات العـربيــة) is a Cairo-based research institute administered by ALECSO. Established as an institution of the Arab League by resolution of the Council of the Arab League on 23 September 1952, the IARS started work on 1 November 1953. Following the creation of ALECSO in 1970, the IARS was brought under ALECSO's administrative control by resolution of the secretary-general dated 10 September 1970. The IARS was admitted to membership of the Federation of Arab Universities in 1994.

== Organisation ==
=== Membership ===
There are 22 member-states of ALECSO, listed below by date of membership:

- 1970: Jordan Algeria Sudan Syria Iraq Kuwait Libya Egypt Yemen
- 1971: Bahrain Palestine Qatar
- 1972: United Arab Emirates Saudi Arabia
- 1973: Oman
- 1974: Tunisia
- 1975: Mauritania
- 1976: Morocco Somalia
- 1978: Djibouti
- 1985: Lebanon
- 2002: Comoros

== See also ==
- Institutions of the Arab League
