= Charter of the Arab League =

Founding treaty of the Arab League

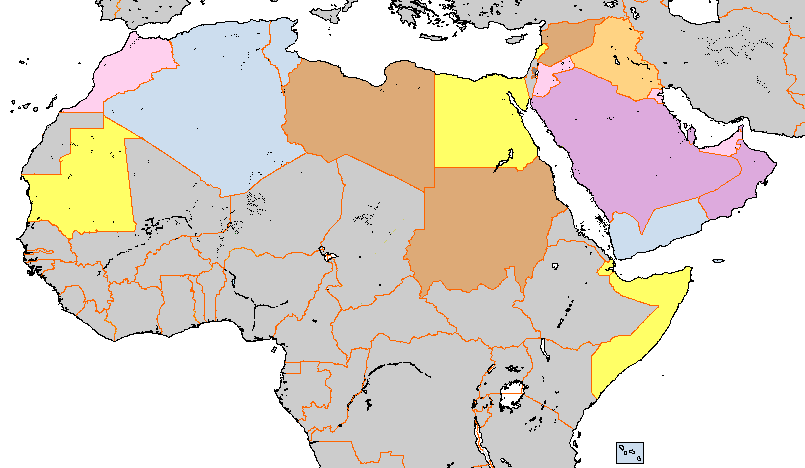
Arab League governments

The Charter of the Arab League (also known as the Pact of the League of Arab States) is the founding treaty of the Arab League. Concluded in 1945, the agreement aims to strengthen relations and improve cooperation in various areas between signatory Arab countries, while also respecting and preserving their sovereignty. The internal regulations of the Council of the Arab League and the committees were agreed to in October 1951. Those of the Secretary-General were agreed to in May 1953.

Since then, governance of the Arab League has been based on the duality of supra-national institutions and the sovereignty of its member states. Preservation of individual statehood derived its strengths from the natural preference of ruling elites to maintain their power and independence in decision making. Moreover, the fear of the richer that the poorer may share their wealth in the name of Arab nationalism, the feuds among Arab rulers, and the influence of external powers that might oppose Arab unity can be seen as obstacles towards a deeper integration of the league.

== Initial signatories ==
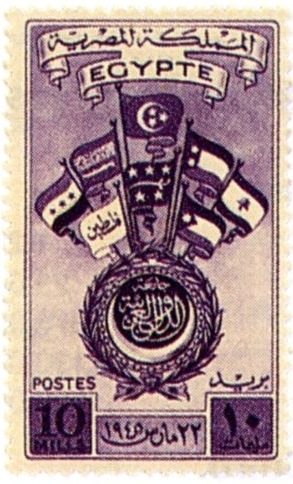
Arab League of states establishment memorial stamp. Showing flags of the 8 establishing countries: Kingdom of Egypt, Kingdom of Saudi Arabia, Mutwakilite Kingdom of Yemen, Hashimite Kingdom of Syria, Hashimite Kingdom of Iraq, Hashimite Kingdom of Jordan, Republic of Lebanon, and Palestine

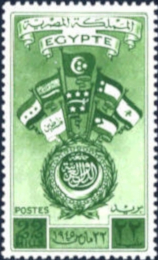
Arab League of states establishment memorial stamp. Showing flags of the 8 establishing countries: Kingdom of Egypt, Kingdom of Saudi Arabia, Mutwakilite Kingdom of Yemen, Hashimite Kingdom of Syria, Hashimite Kingdom of Iraq, Hashimite Kingdom of Jordan, Republic of Lebanon, and Palestine

The Charter was concluded on 22 March 1945 by the governments of Syria, Transjordan, Iraq, Saudi Arabia, Lebanon, Egypt, and North Yemen. A state joins the Arab League by ratifying the Pact.

According to the Charter, "the League of Arab States shall be composed of the: independent Arab States that have signed this Pact."

== Forms of government ==
The member states of the Arab League represent all forms of government, including monarchies, both absolute and constitutional, as well as republics.

| Name | Constitutional form | Head of state | Basis of executive legitimacy |
|---|---|---|---|
| Algeria | Republic | Executive | President is independent of the legislature; head of government is appointed by the president and is accountable to the legislature |
| Bahrain | Constitutional monarchy | Executive | Monarch holds significant executive or legislative power |
| Comoros | Republic | Executive | Head of state is the head of government and is independent of legislature |
| Djibouti | Republic | Executive | President is independent of the legislature; head of government is appointed by the president and is accountable to the legislature |
| Egypt | Republic | Executive | President is independent of the legislature; head of government is appointed by the president and is accountable to the legislature |
| Iraq | Republic | Ceremonial | Head of government is elected by and is accountable to the legislature |
| Jordan | Constitutional monarchy | Executive | Monarch holds significant executive or legislative power |
| Kuwait | Constitutional monarchy | Executive | Monarch holds significant executive or legislative power |
| Lebanon | Republic | Ceremonial | Head of government is elected by and is accountable to the legislature |
| Libya | Republic | Ceremonial | Head of government is elected by and is accountable to the legislature |
| Mauritania | Republic | Executive | President is independent of the legislature; head of government is appointed by the president and is accountable to the legislature |
| Morocco | Constitutional monarchy | Executive | Monarch holds significant executive or legislative power |
| Oman | Absolute monarchy | Executive | All authority vested in absolute monarch |
| Qatar | Absolute monarchy | Executive | All authority vested in absolute monarch |
| Saudi Arabia | Absolute monarchy | Executive | All authority vested in absolute monarch |
| Somalia | Republic | Executive | President is independent of the legislature; head of government is appointed by the president and is accountable to the legislature |
| Sudan | Republic | Executive | Head of state is the head of government and is independent of legislature |
| Syria | Republic | Executive | President is independent of the legislature; head of government is appointed by the president and is accountable to the legislature |
| Tunisia | Republic | Executive | President is independent of the legislature; head of government is appointed by the president and is accountable to the legislature |
| United Arab Emirates | Constitutional monarchy | Executive | Monarch holds significant executive or legislative power |
| Yemen | Republic | Executive | Head of state is the head of government and is independent of legislature |

== Autonomous entities ==
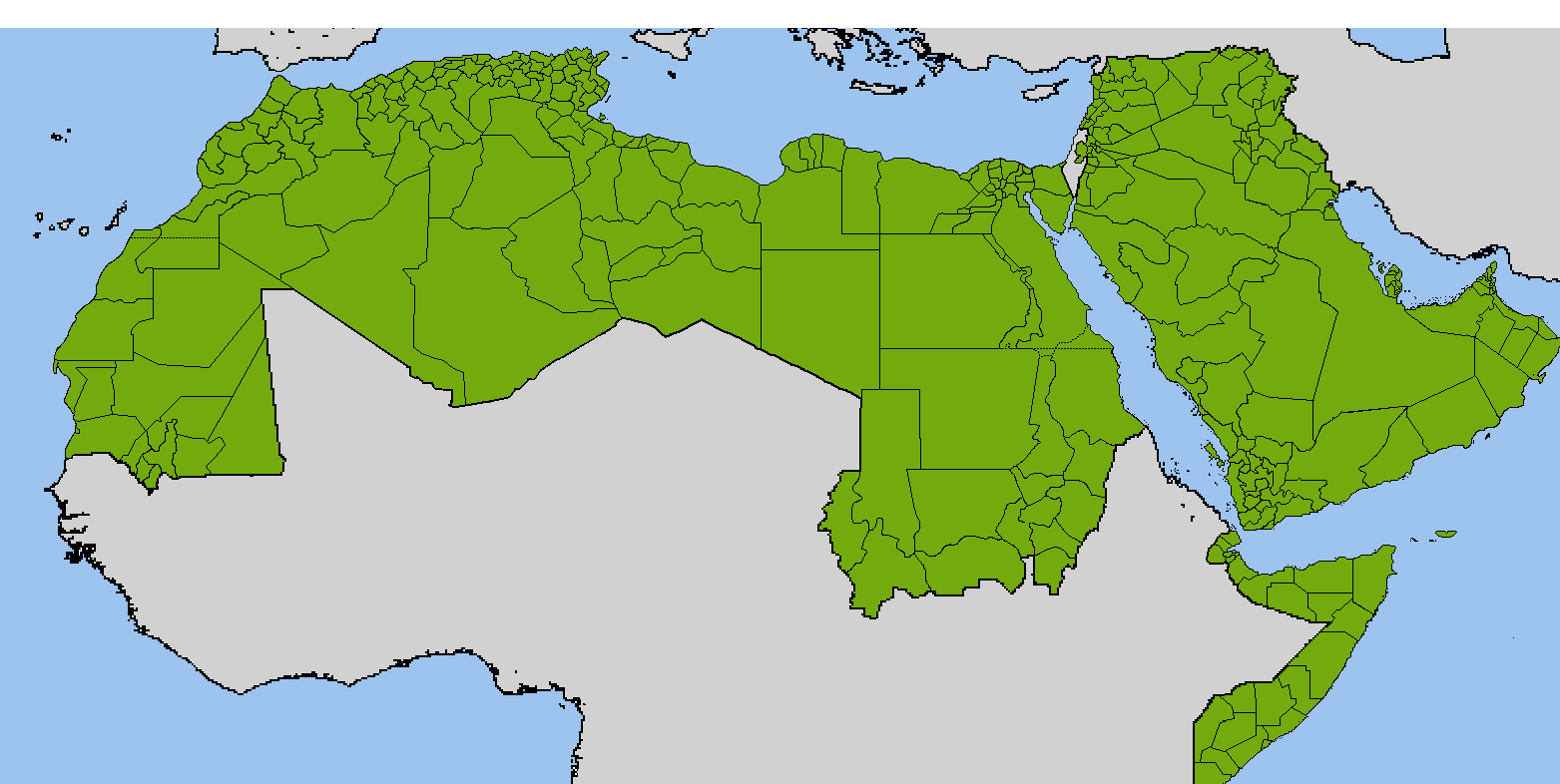
Arab Governorates/Provinces

Officially, Iraqi Kurdistan is the only autonomous entity in the Arab League, but several countries view Palestine as an autonomous entity within Israel. The Palestinian Authority exercises certain sovereign powers within its borders, but is not a fully independent government. The Palestinian Authority administrated territories are internationally recognized as occupied by Israel. The Arab League on the other hand recognizes the State of Palestine as a fully independent state, with Jerusalem as its capital and with embassies in all of the other League member states, with the exception of Somalia.

== See also ==
- Alexandria Protocol
