= General Union of Chambers of Commerce, Industry and Agriculture for Arab Countries =

The General Union of Arab Chambers of Commerce, Industry and Agriculture for Arab Countries (commonly known as the General Union) is a non-governmental organization established in 1951 and headquartered in Beirut, Lebanon. It represents the Arab private sector at the regional and international levels. The organization works to strengthen economic cooperation among Arab chambers of commerce and to promote shared Arab economic interests.

The General Union was created in response to the Arab private sector's need to coordinate Arab economic resources and markets in support of economic development. It promotes intra-Arab cooperation and plays a coordinating role among Arab chambers, particularly in matters relating to trade, exports, imports, and investment.

== Organization ==
The General Union consists of four principal bodies:

- General Conference: A biennial forum for Arab businesspeople to discuss major issues relating to Arab economies and current economic developments, and to propose measures for enhancing cooperation and integration.
- Union Council: Responsible for formulating the Union's general policy and adopting practical measures to promote cooperation among Arab chambers. It includes representatives of all Arab chambers and meets twice a year.
- Executive Committee: Composed of the president of the council, two vice-presidents, and four elected members. It meets before sessions of the council to prepare its work.
- Secretariat General: The executive body of the Union, consisting of the secretary-general, the assistant secretary-general, and supporting staff.

== Committees ==
The General Union operates several specialized committees, including:

- Trade Committee: Established in 1997 to support the participation of Arab chambers in implementing the Arab Free Trade Area scheme.
- Permanent Committee for Labor Affairs: A standing committee whose members are appointed on a permanent basis to ensure continuous follow-up with the other parties concerned with labor affairs, namely governments and labor representatives.
- Committee for Joint Arab-Foreign Chambers of Commerce: A committee whose members are nominated by Arab chambers and federations to follow up on issues related to joint Arab-foreign chambers of commerce. Its term lasts three years.
