= Council of the Arab League =

Institution of the Arab League

The Council of the Arab League (Arabic: مجلس جامعة الدول العربية / ISO 233: Majlis Jāmiʻat ad-Duwal al-ʻArabiyya) (also the Arab League Council) is the principal institution of the Arab League and was created by article 3 of the Charter of the Arab League.

== History ==
On 11 October 2023, Arab foreign ministers held an emergency meeting in Cairo, headed by Morocco, to discuss ways to stop the escalation in the Palestinian territories, and the targeting of civilians during the Gaza war.

== Organisation ==
The Charter states that the Council is to be composed of representatives, as necessary heads of state, heads of government and foreign ministers, from the Arab League member states, each of which shall have a single vote irrespective of the number of representatives.

The presidency of the Council rotates among member states and the secretary-general is appointed by two-thirds majority.

The Council has seven special committees:

- Political
- Economic
- Communications
- Cultural
- Legal
- Social
- Health

== Bibliography ==
- Osmańczyk, Edmund Jan (2003), "League of Arab States", in Mango, Anthony (ed.), Encyclopedia of the United Nations and international agreements, vol. 2 (3 ed.), New York: Routledge
- Oron, Yitzhak, ed. (1960), Middle East Record, vol. 1, London: George Weidenfeld & Nicolson Limited
