= Edmund Osmańczyk =

Polish writer (1913–1989)

Edmund Jan Osmańczyk (10 August 1913 – 4 October 1989), was a Polish writer, author of Encyclopedia of the United Nations and International Agreements.

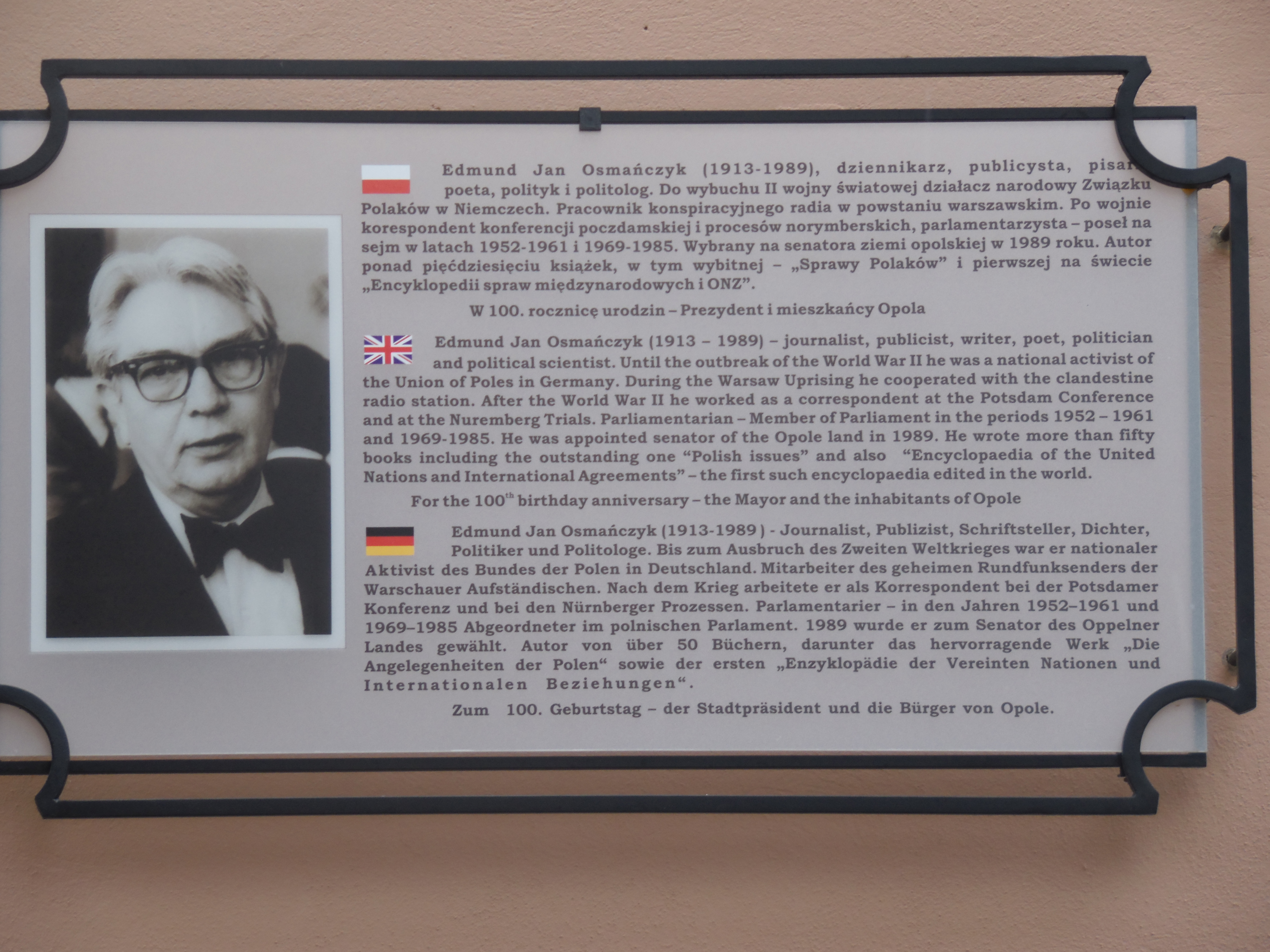
Plaque of Edmund Osmańczyk in Opole

Osmańczyk was born in Deutsch Jägel, Lower Silesia, German Empire into a family of Polish immigrants in German Lower Silesia in 1913. During the interwar period he would contribute to the Union of Poles in Germany, consisting out of Polish immigrants in the Ruhr area (Ruhr Poles) and other industrial centres, as well as out of Polish minority living in villages in the German-Polish 1919–1939 border region. After the Nazi era, he would become a political deputy in communist Poland and promote Re-polonization of Recovered Territories. He died in Warsaw, People's Republic of Poland in 1989.

== Education ==
Osmańczyk's first academic training was as an historian. He obtained a degree in history from the University of Warsaw before going to Berlin to study journalism. He fled from Germany to avoid conscription in the army.

== Fight against Nazi occupation ==
Not just content to wield a pen, Osmańczyk served as a soldier in the resistance force against the German occupation of Warsaw. He participated in the 1944 uprising. Later, in 1945, when the resistance against the Germans became successful, he became a war correspondent for the Polish Army.

== Journalism career and major works ==
Osmańczyk covered the Potsdam Conference and the Nuremberg trials extensively. His articles on these were compiled and published as Prussia in 1947. The reporting on these two events marked the beginning of phase in his journalistic career during which he became and foreign correspondent. Between 1946–1968, Osmańczyk traveled to several countries and participated in important international conferences. He later became a spokesman for the United Nations.

Osmańczyk's literary debut had come in 1937, with the publication of his poetry collection, Sunny Freedom. His later works, like the Poles (1947), were compilations of his experiences of war. His later books include Himmler (1951), Asia in Geneva (1955), Notre Europe (1971). He also wrote erudite commentaries such as the Encyclopedia of International Affairs and the United Nations (1974) and the Encyclopedia of the United Nations and International Relations (1982). His books won several state and international awards.

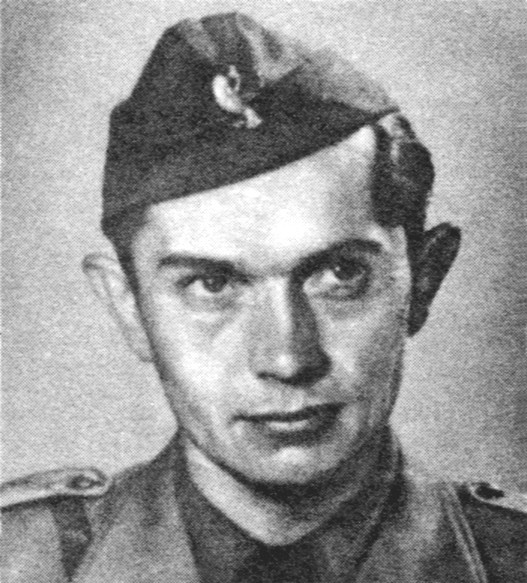
A photo of Edmund Jan Osmańczyk from 1945.

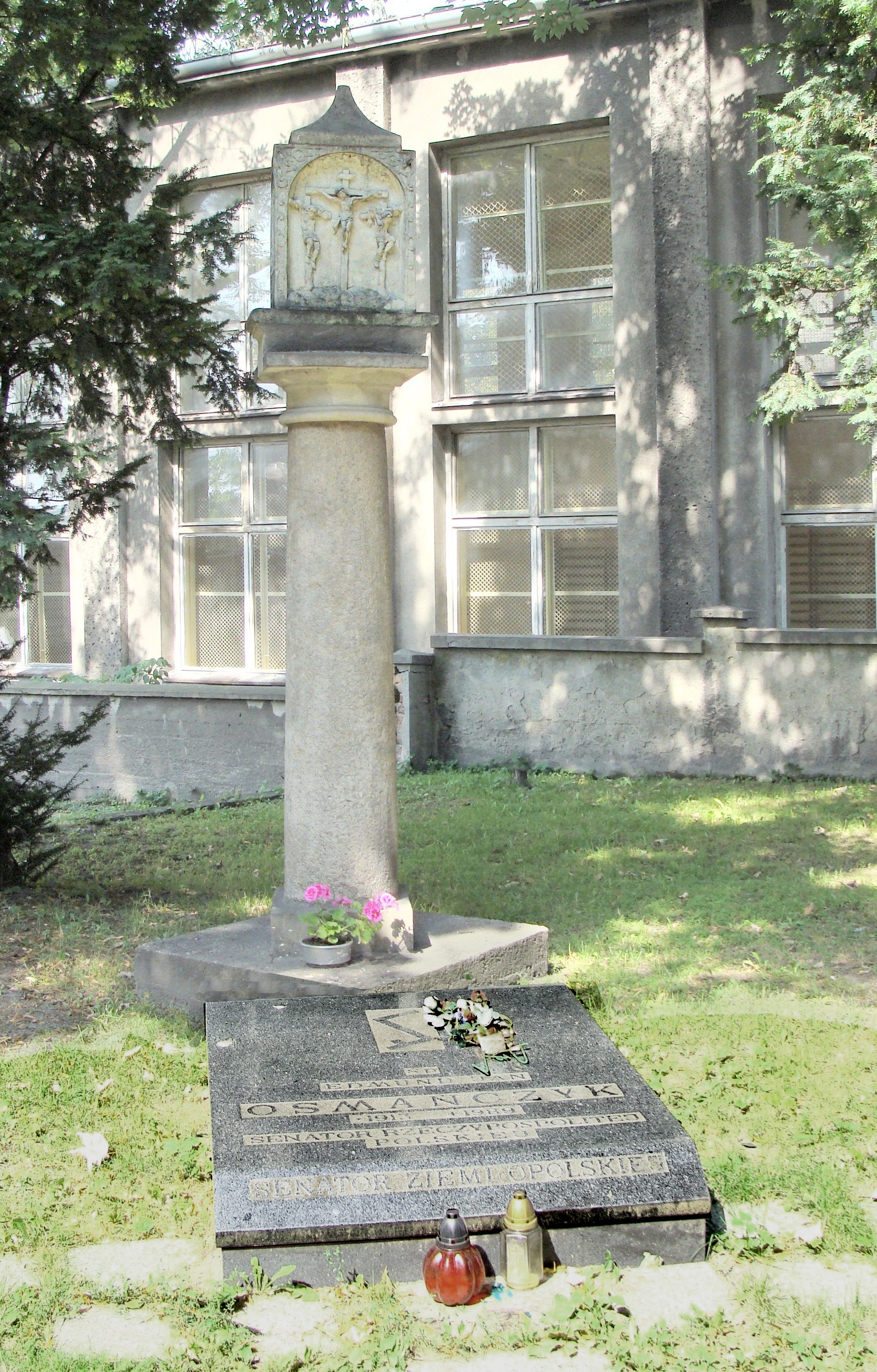
Osmańczyk's grave

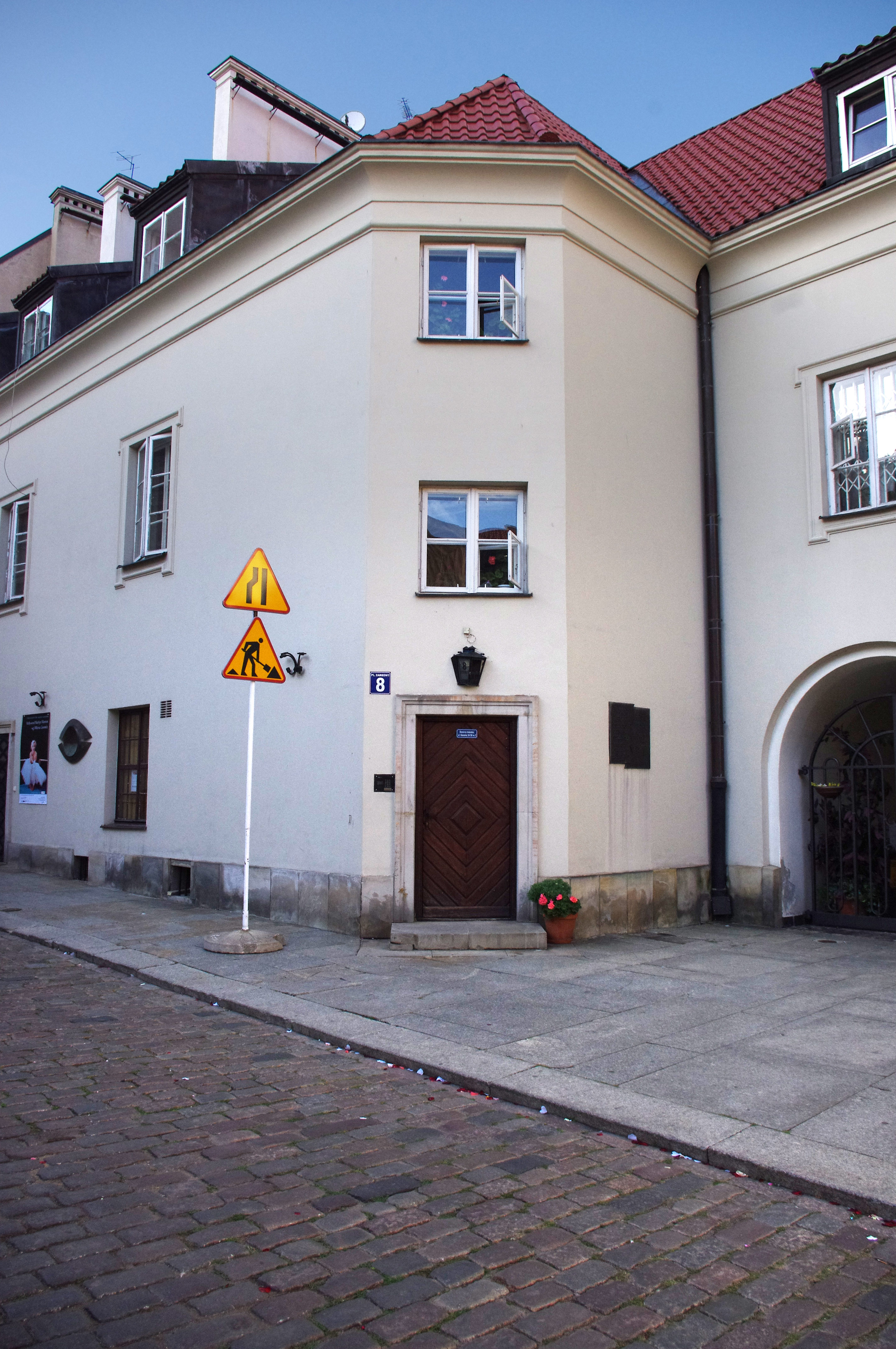
Osmańczyk's house in Warsaw.
