= 2011–12 JS Kabylie season =

JS Kabylie
2011–12 season
- Chairman: Mohand Chérif Hannachi
- Head coach: Moussa Saïb (from June 2011) (until 2 September 2011); Meziane Ighil (from 17 September 2011) (until 29 January 2012); Mourad Karouf (from January 2012) (until June 2012)
- Stadium: Stade du 1er Novembre 1954
- Ligue 1: 9th
- Algerian Cup: Round of 16
- Confederation Cup: Group stage
- Top goalscorer: League: Salim Hanifi (9); All: Salim Hanifi (12)

In the 2011–12 season, JS Kabylie competed in the Ligue 1 for the 41st season, as well as the Algerian Cup.

== Squad list ==
Players and squad numbers last updated on 18 November 2011.
Note: Flags indicate national team as has been defined under FIFA eligibility rules. Players may hold more than one non-FIFA nationality.

No.	Nat.	Position	Name	Date of birth (age)	Signed from
Goalkeepers
	(Algeria)	GK	Nabil Mazari	18 February 1984 (aged 27)	(Algeria) Youth system
	(Algeria)	GK	Malik Asselah	8 July 1986 (aged 25)	(Algeria) NA Hussein Dey
Defenders
	(Algeria)	RB	Belkacem Remache	12 October 1985 (aged 26)	(Algeria) USM Annaba
	(Algeria)	LB	Chemseddine Nessakh	4 January 1988 (aged 23)	(Algeria) ASM Oran
	(Algeria)	CB	Ali Rial	26 March 1980 (aged 31)	(Algeria) USM Alger
	(Algeria)	RB	Jugurtha Meftah	28 July 1990 (aged 21)	(Algeria) Youth system
	(Algeria)	CB	Koceila Berchiche	5 August 1985 (aged 26)	(Algeria) RC Kouba
	(Algeria)	CB	Essaïd Belkalem	1 January 1989 (aged 23)	(Algeria) Youth system
Midfielders
	(Algeria)	DM	Hocine El Orfi	27 January 1987 (aged 24)	(Algeria) Paradou AC
	(Algeria)	RM	Saad Tedjar	14 January 1986 (aged 25)	(Algeria) Paradou AC
	(Algeria)	DM	Lyès Saïdi	24 August 1987 (aged 24)	(Algeria) ORB Akbou
	(Algeria)	DM	Mokhtar Lamhene	18 January 1990 (aged 21)	(Algeria) Youth system
	(Algeria)	LM	Nabil Yaâlaoui	1 May 1987 (aged 24)	(Algeria) WA Tlemcen
Forwards
	(Algeria)	RW	Sid Ali Yahia-Chérif	4 January 1985 (aged 26)	(Algeria) RC Kouba
	(Algeria)	FW	Farès Hamiti	26 June 1987 (aged 24)	(Algeria) USM Blida
	(Algeria)	FW	Sofiane Younes	22 May 1985 (aged 26)	(Algeria) CR Belouizdad

== Competitions ==
=== Overview ===
Competition	Record								Started round	Final position / round	First match	Last match
Competition	G	W	D	L	GF	GA	GD	Win %	Started round	Final position / round	First match	Last match
Ligue 1	30	10	11	9	29	23	+6	33.33	—N/a	9th	15 September 2011	21 May 2012
Algerian Cup	3	2	0	1	4	2	+2	66.67	Round of 64	Round of 16	30 December 2011	10 March 2012
Confederation Cup	6	0	0	6	1	9	−8	0.00	Group stage		16 July 2011	17 September 2011
Total	39	12	11	16	34	34	+0	30.77				

Updated to match played 9 May 2018
Source: Competitions

== League table ==
Pos	Team	Pld	W	D	L	GF	GA	GD	Pts
7	CA Batna	30	12	8	10	38	25	+13	44
8	WA Tlemcen	30	12	8	10	39	37	+2	44
9	JS Kabylie	30	10	11	9	29	23	+6	41
10	USM El Harrach	30	11	5	14	28	31	−3	38
11	MC El Eulma	30	10	8	12	38	39	−1	38

Updated to match(es) played on 19 April 2018. Source: DZFoot
Rules for classification: 1) points; 2) head-to-head points; 3) head-to-head goal difference; 4) goal difference; 5) total goals; 6) fairplay ranking; 7) playoff.

=== Results summary ===
Overall								Home						Away					
Pld	W	D	L	GF	GA	GD	Pts	W	D	L	GF	GA	GD	W	D	L	GF	GA	GD
30	10	11	9	29	23	+6	41	8	5	2	22	11	+11	2	6	7	7	12	−5

Last updated: 29 December 2014.
Source: Competitive matches

=== Results by round ===
Round	1	2	3	4	5	6	7	8	9	10	11	12	13	14	15	16	17	18	19	20	21	22	23	24	25	26	27	28	29	30
Ground	H	A	H	A	H	A	H	A	H	H	A	H	A	H	A	A	H	A	H	A	H	A	H	A	A	H	A	H	A	H
Result	W	L	D	L	W	D	L	W	D	W	W	D	D	W	L	D	L	D	W	D	D	L	D	L	D	W	L	W	L	W
Position																														9

Source: Competitive matches
A = Away; H = Home; W = Win; D = Draw; L = Loss

=== Matches ===
6 September 2011 Round 1	JS Kabylie	1–0	MC Alger	Tizi Ouzou
19:00	Boulemdaïs 90+1'	Report		Stadium: Stade du 1er Novembre 1954; Referee: Mohamed Bichari

27 September 2011 Round 2	CR Belouizdad	1–0	JS Kabylie	Belouizdad
19:00	Slimani 90+3'	Report		Stadium: Stade 20 Août 1955; Referee: Oulbsir

24 September 2011 Round 3	JS Kabylie	1–1	CA Batna	Tizi Ouzou
18:00	Hemani 65' (pen.)	Report	Messadia 80'	Stadium: Stade du 1er Novembre 1954; Attendance: 0 (close doors); Referee: Mohamed Sahraoui

1 October 2011 Round 4	WA Tlemcen	1–0	JS Kabylie	Tlemcen
16:00	Tiouli 85'	Report		Stadium: Stade Akid Lotfi; Attendance: 0 (close doors); Referee: Rafik Achouri

15 October 2011 Round 5	JS Kabylie	1–0	AS Khroub	Tizi Ouzou
18:00	Hanifi 1'	Report		Stadium: Stade du 1er Novembre 1954; Referee: Mohamed Amine Ghorbal

22 October 2011 Round 6	MC El Eulma	1–1	JS Kabylie	El Eulma
16:00	Kadri 4'	Report	Rial 5'	Stadium: Stade Messaoud Zougar; Referee: Mohamed Babou

29 October 2011 Round 7	JS Kabylie	0–1	USM El Harrach	Tizi Ouzou
16:00		Report	Aïssaoui 10'	Stadium: Stade du 1er Novembre 1954; Referee: Redouane Necib

4 November 2011 Round 8	MC Oran	1–2	JS Kabylie	Oran
15:00	Korbiaa 66'	Report	Boulemdaïs 16'; Hemani 27'	Stadium: Ahmed Zabana Stadium; Referee: Boubekeur Zouaoui

19 November 2011 Round 9	JS Kabylie	0–0	USM Alger	Tizi Ouzou
15:00		Report		Stadium: Stade du 1er-Novembre-1954; Referee: Farouk Houasnia

22 November 2011 Round 10	JS Kabylie	1–0	CS Constantine	Tizi Ouzou
15:00	Tedjar 84' (pen.)	Report		Stadium: Stade du 1er Novembre 1954; Referee: Sofiane Bousseter

26 November 2011 Round 11	MC Saïda	1–2	JS Kabylie	Saida
18:00	Saâdi 90+2'	Report	Boulemdaïs 7'; Hanifi 23'	Stadium: April 13, 1958 Stadium; Referee: Habibatni

3 December 2011 Round 12	JS Kabylie	2–2	ES Sétif	Tizi Ouzou
15:00	Hanifi 60'; Tedjar 74' (pen.)	Report	Hachoud 38'; Aoudia 50'	Stadium: Stade du 1er Novembre 1954; Referee: Mohamed Amine Ghorbal

10 December 2011 Round 13	NA Hussein Dey	0–0	JS Kabylie	Hussein Dey
15:00		Report		Stadium: Zioui Brothers Stadium; Referee: Mehdi Abid Charef

17 December 2011 Round 14	JS Kabylie	1–0	JSM Béjaïa	Tizi Ouzou
15:00	Hanifi 59'	Report		Stadium: Stade du 1er Novembre 1954; Referee: Mokhtar Amalou

24 December 2011 Round 15	ASO Chlef	2–1	JS Kabylie	Chlef
18:00	Messaoud 44' (pen.); Mellouli 90+1'	Report	Hemani 74'	Stadium: Stade Mohamed Boumezrag; Referee: Mohamed Bichari

21 January 2012 Round 16	MC Alger	0–0	JS Kabylie	Algiers
17:45		Report		Stadium: Stade 5 Juillet 1962; Referee: Sofiane Bousseter

28 January 2012 Round 17	JS Kabylie	0–1	CR Belouizdad	Tizi Ouzou
15:00		Report	Slimani 69'	Stadium: Stade du 1er Novembre 1954; Referee: Redouane Necib

31 January 2012 Round 18	CA Batna	0–0	JS Kabylie	Batna
17:45		Report		Stadium: Mustapha Seffouhi Stadium; Referee: Mohamed Amine Ghorbal

4 February 2012 Round 19	JS Kabylie	2–0	WA Tlemcen	Tizi Ouzou
15:00	Hanifi 23', 78'	Report		Stadium: Stade du 1er Novembre 1954; Referee: Merzak Halalchi

18 February 2012 Round 20	AS Khroub	0–0	JS Kabylie	El Khroub
15:00		Report		Stadium: Abed Hamdani Stadium; Referee: Mohamed Sahraoui

3 March 2012 Round 21	JS Kabylie	1–1	MC El Eulma	Tizi Ouzou
15:00	Belkalem 35'	Report	Berchiche 14'	Stadium: Stade du 1er Novembre 1954; Referee: Mohamed Saïdi

17 March 2012 Round 22	USM El Harrach	1–0	JS Kabylie	Algiers
15:00	Bounedjah 4'	Report		Stadium: Stade 1er Novembre 1954; Referee: Mehdi Abid Charef

24 March 2012 Round 23	JS Kabylie	2–2	MC Oran	Tizi Ouzou
15:00	Boulemdaïs 20'; Belkalem 54'	Report	Bousehaba 82'; Aouedj 90+1'	Stadium: Stade du 1er Novembre 1954; Referee: Sofiane Bousseter

7 April 2012 Round 24	USM Alger	1–0	JS Kabylie	Algiers
17:45	Djediat 22'	Report		Stadium: Stade Omar Hammadi; Attendance: 0 (close doors); Referee: Mustapha Ghorbal

14 April 2012 Round 25	CS Constantine	0–0	JS Kabylie	Constantine
16:00		Report		Stadium: Stade Mohamed Hamlaoui; Attendance: 0 (close doors); Referee: Redouane Necib

28 April 2012 Round 26	JS Kabylie	4–0	MC Saïda	Tizi Ouzou
15:00	Hemani 20', 61'; Hanifi 46'; Remache 76'	Report		Stadium: Stade du 1er Novembre 1954; Referee: Farid Bahloul

5 May 2012 Round 27	ES Sétif	2–1	JS Kabylie	Sétif
16:00	Nadji 58'; Benmoussa 63' (pen.)	Report	Hanifi 81'	Stadium: Stade 8 Mai 1945; Referee: Mohamed Saïdi

12 May 2012 Round 28	JS Kabylie	3–1	NA Hussein Dey	Tizi Ouzou
17:00	Hemani 18'; Hanifi 63'; Boulemdaïs 83'	Report	Zenou 44'	Stadium: Stade du 1er Novembre 1954; Referee: Boubekeur Zouaoui

15 May 2012 Round 29	JSM Béjaïa	1–0	JS Kabylie	Béjaïa
15:00	Gasmi 63' (pen.)	Report		Stadium: Stade de l'Unité Maghrébine; Attendance: 0 (close doors); Referee: Merzak Halalchi

19 May 2012 Round 30	JS Kabylie	3–2	ASO Chlef	Tizi Ouzou
17:00	Boulemdaïs 72'; Rial 75'; Hemani 85'	Report	Gharbi 31'; Messaoud 88' (pen.)	Stadium: Stade du 1er Novembre 1954; Referee: Mehdi Abid Charef

== Algerian Cup ==
30 December 2011 Round of 64	JS Kabylie	1–0	MSP Batna	Tizi Ouzou
14:30	Hanifi 43' (pen.)	Report		Stadium: Stade du 1er Novembre 1954; Referee: Mohamed Saïdi

10 March 2012 Round of 32	JS Kabylie	3–1 (a.e.t.)	MB Hessasna	Tizi Ouzou
14:00	Hemani 21', 112'; Hanifi 120'	Report	Debache 73'	Stadium: Stade du 1er Novembre 1954; Referee: Said Aouina

10 March 2012 Round of 16	USM Alger	1–0 (a.e.t.)	JS Kabylie	Algiers
17:00	Laïfaoui 111'	Report		Stadium: Stade Omar Hammadi; Referee: Boubekeur Zouaoui

== Confederation Cup ==
=== Group stage ===
==== Group B ====
Team	Pld	W	D	L	GF	GA	GD	Pts	MAS	SUN	DCMP	JSK
(Morocco) Maghreb de Fès	6	4	2	0	8	2	+6	14	—	1–0	3–0	1–0
(Nigeria) Sunshine Stars	6	3	2	1	6	3	+3	11	1–1	—	2–0	1–0
(Democratic Republic of the Congo) Motema Pembe	6	2	2	2	5	6	−1	8	1–1	0–0	—	2–0
(Algeria) JS Kabylie	6	0	0	6	1	9	−8	0	0–1	1–2	0–2	—

Legend: Blue = home team win; Yellow = draw; Red = away team win.

16 July 2011 1	Maghreb de Fès (Morocco)	1–0	(Algeria) JS Kabylie	Fes
20:00 UTC+01:00	Chemseddine Chtibi 85'			Stadium: Fes Stadium; Referee: Mohamed Said Kordi (Tunisia)

29 July 2011 2	JS Kabylie (Algeria)	1–2	(Nigeria) Sunshine Stars	Algiers
21:00 UTC+01:00	Salim Hanifi 18'		Emmanuel Sunday 36'; Sakibu Atanda 74'	Stadium: Stade 5 Juillet 1962

12 August 2011 3	JS Kabylie (Algeria)	0–2	(Democratic Republic of the Congo) Motema Pembe	Algiers
22:00 UTC+01:00			Ilongo Ngasanya 34' (pen.), 68'	Stadium: Stade 5 Juillet 1962

27 August 2011 4	Motema Pembe (Democratic Republic of the Congo)	2–0	(Algeria) JS Kabylie	Kinshasa
14:00 UTC+01:00	Inasawa Nfumu 80' (pen.); Ngandu Junior 88'			Stadium: Stade des Martyrs

10 September 2011 5	JS Kabylie (Algeria)	0–1	(Morocco) Maghreb de Fès	Algiers
21:00 UTC+01:00			Hamza Abourazzouk 55'	Stadium: Stade 5 Juillet 1962

17 September 2011 6	Sunshine Stars (Nigeria)	1–0	(Algeria) JS Kabylie	Ijebu Ode
16:00 UTC+01:00	Ajani Ibrahim 11'			Stadium: Gateway Stadium

== Squad information ==
=== Playing statistics ===
No.	Pos	Nat	Player	Total		Ligue 1		Algerian Cup		Confederation Cup	
No.	Pos	Nat	Player	Apps	Goals	Apps	Goals	Apps	Goals	Apps	Goals
1	GK	(Algeria) ALG	Malik Asselah	32	0	27	0	2	0	3	0
30	GK	(Algeria) ALG	Nabil Mazari	7	0	3	0	1	0	3	0
27	DF	(Algeria) ALG	Abderraouf Zarabi	24	0	22	0	2	0	0	0
5	DF	(Algeria) ALG	Ali Rial	35	2	27	2	3	0	5	0
2	DF	(Algeria) ALG	Belkacem Remache	30	1	23	1	3	0	4	0
25	DF	(Algeria) ALG	Nordine Assami	11	0	5	0	1	0	5	0
26	DF	(Algeria) ALG	Abderrezak Bitam	15	0	14	0	1	0	0	0
21	DF	(Algeria) ALG	Essaïd Belkalem	13	2	12	2	1	0	0	0
	DF	(Algeria) ALG	Lyès Saïdi	17	0	12	0	2	0	3	0
3	DF	(Algeria) ALG	Sofiane Khelili	15	0	12	0	1	0	2	0
4	DF	(Algeria) ALG	Chemseddine Nessakh	28	0	21	0	1	0	6	0
16	DF	(Algeria) ALG	Jugurtha Meftah	2	0	2	0	0	0	0	0
33	DF	(Algeria) ALG	Chaabane Meftah	1	0	1	0	0	0	0	0
22	DF	(Algeria) ALG	Okba Hezil	10	0	6	0	0	0	4	0
35	DF	(Algeria) ALG	Mohamed Hikem	6	0	6	0	0	0	0	0
11	MF	(Algeria) ALG	Kaci Sedkaoui	26	0	23	0	3	0	0	0
7	MF	(Algeria) ALG	Hocine Metref	22	0	20	0	2	0	0	0
15	MF	(Algeria) ALG	Hamza Ziad	21	0	14	0	1	0	6	0
8	MF	(Algeria) ALG	Saad Tedjar	24	2	19	2	1	0	4	0
28	MF	(Ivory Coast) CIV	Madani Camara	32	0	23	0	3	0	6	0
6	MF	(Algeria) ALG	Hocine El Orfi	31	0	24	0	2	0	5	0
23	MF	(Algeria) ALG	Mokhtar Lamhene	13	0	9	0	1	0	3	0
	MF	(Algeria) ALG	Malik Raiah	1	0	0	0	1	0	0	0
19	FW	(Algeria) ALG	Nabil Hemani	29	9	26	7	3	2	0	0
14	FW	(Algeria) ALG	Hamza Boulemdaïs	33	6	25	6	2	0	6	0
17	FW	(Algeria) ALG	Salim Hanifi	31	12	23	9	3	2	5	1
	FW	(Algeria) ALG	Saïd Ferguène	1	0	1	0	0	0	0	0
Players transferred out during the season
	DF	(Algeria) ALG	Lamara Douicher	1	0	0	0	0	0	1	0
	MF	(Algeria) ALG	Billel Naïli	1	0	0	0	0	0	1	0
10	MF	(Algeria) ALG	Sofiane Younes	16	0	10	0	0	0	6	0
9	FW	(Mali) MLI	Makan Dembélé	6	0	5	0	1	0	0	0

Last updated: 23 November 2017
Source: fr.soccerway.com

=== Goalscorers ===
Includes all competitive matches. The list is sorted alphabetically by surname when total goals are equal.

No.	Nat.	Player	Pos.	L 1	AC	CC 3	TOTAL
17	(Algeria)	Salim Hanifi	FW	9	2	1	12
19	(Algeria)	Nabil Hemani	FW	7	2	0	9
14	(Algeria)	Hamza Boulemdaïs	FW	6	0	0	6
5	(Algeria)	Ali Rial	DF	2	0	0	2
21	(Algeria)	Essaïd Belkalem	DF	2	0	0	2
8	(Algeria)	Saad Tedjar	MF	2	0	0	2
2	(Algeria)	Belkacem Remache	DF	1	0	0	1
Own Goals				0	0	0	0
Totals				29	4	1	34

== Transfers ==
=== In ===
Date	Pos	Player	From club	Transfer fee	Source
13 June 2011	FW	(Algeria) Salim Hanifi	RC Kouba	Free transfer	
21 June 2011	MF	(Algeria) Hamza Ziad	MSP Batna	Free transfer	
25 June 2011	DF	(Algeria) Okba Hezil	MSP Batna	€20 000	
27 June 2011	MF	(Ivory Coast) Madani Camara	MC El Eulma	Free transfer	
29 June 2011	FW	(Algeria) Mohamed Maâyouf	WA Boufarik	Free transfer	
29 June 2011	DF	(Algeria) Nordine Assami	(France) Gap FC	Free transfer	
5 July 2011	FW	(Algeria) Hamza Boulemdaïs	MC El Eulma	Free transfer	
6 July 2011	MF	(Algeria) Hocine Metref	ES Sétif	Free transfer	
13 July 2011	FW	(Algeria) Nabil Hemani	ES Sétif	Free transfer	
24 July 2011	MF	(Algeria) Kaci Sedkaoui	NA Hussein Dey	Free transfer	
13 October 2011	DF	(Algeria) Abderraouf Zarabi	(France) Nîmes	Free transfer	

=== Out ===
Date	Pos	Player	To club	Transfer fee	Source
29 June 2011	FW	(Algeria) Farès Hamiti	USM Alger	Free transfer	
1 July 2011	MF	(Algeria) Nabil Yaâlaoui	MC Alger	Free transfer	
1 July 2011	MF	(Algeria) Billel Naïli	CR Belouizdad	Undisclosed	
6 July 2011	FW	(Algeria) Sid Ali Yahia-Chérif	(France) Istres FC	Undisclosed	
11 December 2011	FW	(Algeria) Sofiane Younes	MC Alger	Free transfer	
