= Meftah =

Meftah (meaning key in Arabic) may refer to:

- Meftah (town), a town and commune in Blida Province, Algeria
- Meftah District, a district in Blida Province, Algeria

== People ==
- Mohamed Rabie Meftah, Algerian footballer
- Mahieddine Meftah, former Algerian national footballer
- Rahim Meftah, Algerian footballer
- Jugurtha Meftah, Algerian football player
- Chaâbane Meftah, Algerian football player
- Meftah Ghazalla, Libyan football goalkeeper
- Habib Meftah Bouchehri, Iranian percussionist
- Abdellatif Meftah, French long-distance runner

== See also ==
- Miftah (disambiguation)
- MEFTA (disambiguation)
