= Middle East economic integration =

Efforts to unify production systems across Western Asia and Egypt

The oil industry significantly impacts the entire region, both through the wealth that it generates and through the movement of labor. Most of the countries in the region have undertaken efforts to diversify their economies in recent years, however.

Policies advocating Middle East economic integration aim to bring about peace, stability, and prosperity in the Middle East, which they believe can only be sustained over the long run via regional economic cooperation.

== Background ==
Former U.S. Secretary of State Warren Christopher said that, "Governments can create the climate for economic growth...[but] only the private sector can produce a peace that will endure."

=== Benefits of integration ===
Countries seek greater regional integration in order to:

- make economic welfare gains,
- increase the region's collective bargaining power in global issues, and
- maintain security and prevent conflict.

Economic integration requires good governance, education reform, social investing, knowledge economy, market economy, privatization and freedom of press.

=== Objectives ===
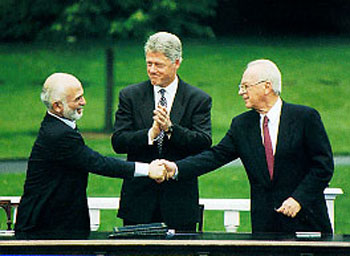
A handshake between King Hussein I of Jordan and Israeli Prime Minister Yitzhak Rabin, accompanied by former U.S. President Bill Clinton, during the Israel–Jordan peace negotiations, October 26, 1994

In 1993, Israeli Prime Minister Shimon Peres, a leading architect of the Oslo peace plan, envisioned that:

The next stage, after bilateral and multilateral relationships have been established, will entail formation of regional industries through the cooperation of international bodies and independent international consortiums. At this point, the regional economic process will be upgraded and the new reality, in which business precedes politics, will be instituted. Ultimately, the Middle East will unite in a common market after we achieve peace. And the very existence of this common market will foster vital interests in maintaining peace over the long term.

=== Integration and peace ===
A prerequisite to economic integration is the establishment of peace. To date, several initiatives have enabled rapprochement among former enemies:

The Oslo Peace Accords and the 1994 Israel–Jordan peace treaty have promulgated greater economic interactions between Israel and its Arab neighbors. Despite this progress, problems like the Israeli–Palestinian conflict continue to be a hindrance to peace and development. Furthermore, the instability created by the war in Afghanistan, civil wars in Syria, Libya, Yemen and Egypt and the 2003 U.S. invasion of Iraq are considered negative factors to be overcome before the establishment of an economic union in this region.

== Middle East and North Africa (MENA) Economic Summits ==
Following the Israel–Jordan peace treaty in 1994 a series of Economic Summits were organised, to promote regional economic development and economic cooperation with Israel.

- The first Economic Summit was held in Casablanca, Morocco, on 30 October to 1 November 1994.
- The second was held in Amman, Jordan on 29-31 October, 1995
- The third was held in Cairo, Egypt on 12-14 November 1996
- The forth was held in Doha, Qatar on 16-18 November 1997

Following the 1997 conference, the Middle East peace process suffered a serious setback due to Benjamin Netanyahu government's policies that alienated the Arab countries (namely the refusal to work towards establishment of an independent Palestine State), which refused to discuss economic cooperation with Israel unless it made some concessions. As a result no more summits were held.

In the 1995 summit the actions agreed included:

- The establishment of a Bank for Economic Cooperation and Development in the Middle East and North Africa will be established in Cairo.
- The establishment of a Regional Tourism Board, the Middle East-Mediterranean Travel and Tourism Association, to facilitate tourism and promote the region as a unique and attractive tourist destination.
- The establishment of a Regional Business Council to promote cooperation and trade among the private sectors of the countries of the region.
- The formal inauguration of the Economic Summit Executive Secretariat, which is located in Rabat and works to advance the public-private partnership, promoting contacts, sharing data and fostering private sector investment in the region.

== Regional characteristics of MENA ==
- Despite many attempts since World War II to promote economic integration and political cooperation among states in the MENA region, economic interactions have remained limited. The scale of regional merchandise trade is limited, amounting to a mere 7–8% of total exports and imports. (For comparison, regional trade in Europe amounts to about 60%.)

Intra-regional trade, (% of total trade)	EU	CEE+CIS	Asia	Africa	Middle East	Western hemisphere
Average (1991–97), source: International Monetary Fund	62.1	29.6	36.8	9.0	7.1	18.3

- Capital transactions have also been relatively limited, with the exception of large official flows from the oil-exporting economies to other Arab countries, particularly after the 1973–4 and 1979–80 oil-price increases. Financiers estimate that up to US$2 trillion in investable assets originate in the Persian Gulf region, the bulk of which is parked abroad, often as American Treasury bills and in places like Switzerland and London. Increasingly, however, Arabs are investing in their home region; governments are also spending billions on infrastructure and national investment agencies are looking for opportunities.
- Tourism and other non-factor service-flow patterns have been quite segmented. Some countries—primarily Egypt, Jordan, Lebanon, Morocco and Tunisia—have received substantial tourist flows from MENA countries. For others, particularly Israel, political and security considerations limit regional tourism.
- Labour flows have been important, taking the form of:
1. Flows from non-oil economies to the Cooperation Council for the Arab States of the Gulf (GCC) economies, and
2. Palestinian labour working in Israel. In the 1990s, these flows have been subject to major restrictions and there has been recent substitution of Asian labour for Arab labour in both cases. MENA does not have the kind of labour mobility found, for example, in the European Union, where the citizens of one country have the right to work in others.
- Other than the GCC and OPEC, there has been little in the way of regional economic policy coordination.

Prospects for the MENA Region
MENA Region	2009	2010	2011
Real GDP growth	2.8	3.6	4.5
Real GDP growth (PPP)	2.7	3.6	4.5
Exports (change %)	−9.5	2.6	5.2
Imports (change %)	1.2	4.9	6.6
CA (% of GDP)	−0.1	1.5	0.9

== Initiatives for integration ==
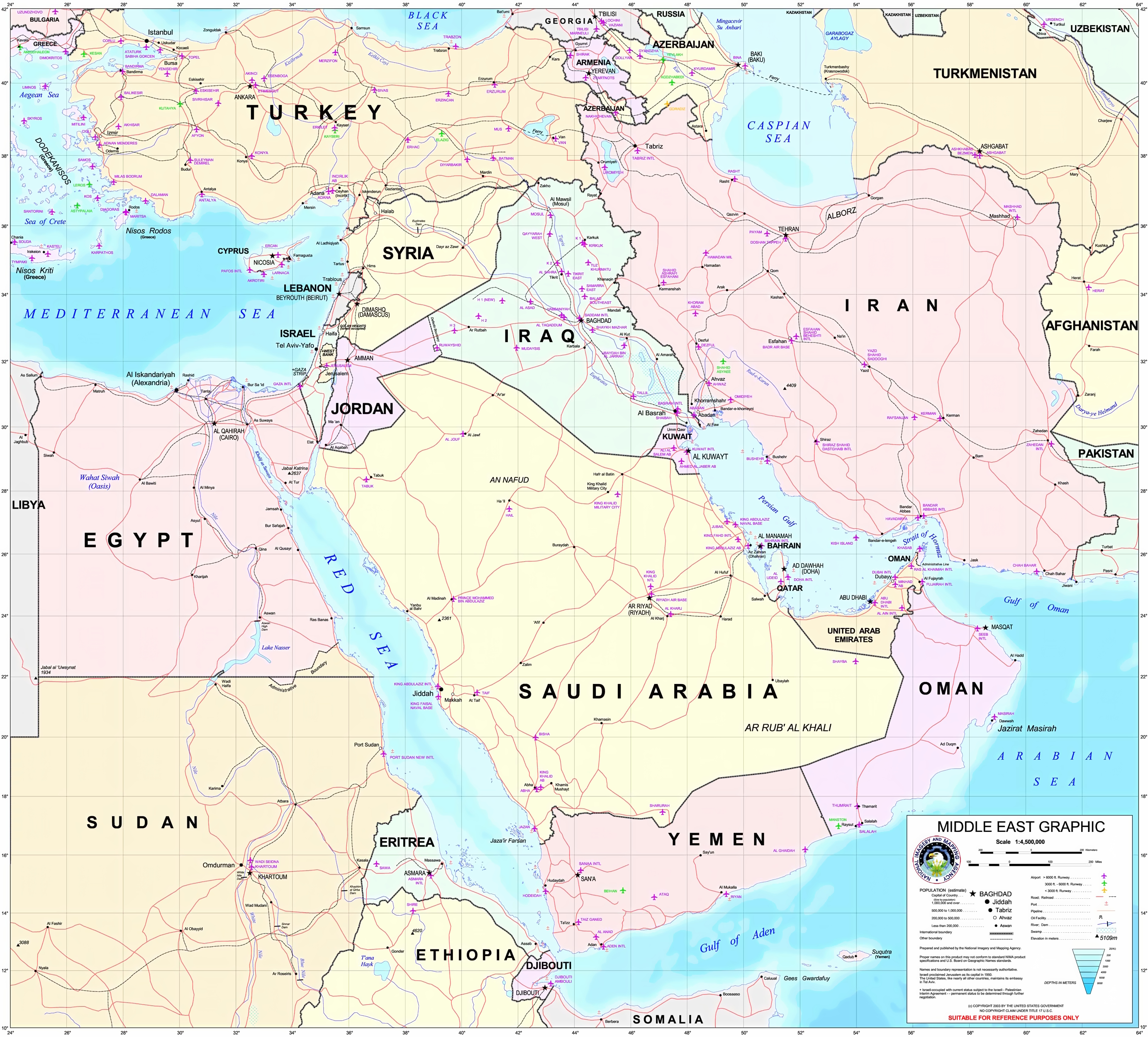
Arabic, Persian, Turkish, Kurdish and Hebrew, are the main languages spoken in the Middle East by over 400 million people; English and French are common supplementary languages.

=== Examples ===
1. Council of Arab Economic Unity: Established in 1964, with the ultimate goal of achieving complete economic unity among its member states. An intermediate objective of customs union has been set for 2015.
2. Economic Cooperation Organization: Established in 1985. The common objective is to establish a single market for goods and services in West Asia, like the European Union.
3. U.S.–Middle East Free Trade Area: Established in 2003 by the United States, this aimed to gradually increase trade and investment in the Middle East by assisting countries to implement domestic reforms and protecting private property rights.
4. Euro-Mediterranean free trade area: The initial aim is to create a matrix of Free Trade Agreements. The next step would be a single free trade area of 600–800 million people, including, eventually, the European Union.

=== Challenges and opportunities ===
- Governance: Good governance attracts capital. Some Middle Eastern countries such as Saudi Arabia have made positive steps in reforming their judicial systems or adapting their capital market laws to international standards. Building efficient and capable public institutions needs to be a priority.
- Raise competitiveness levels of these economies. This can be achieved through overhauling and aggressively investing in the region's education system. If the education policies of the region deliver unwanted skills to the market, international investors will not be keen to come in, especially in the services sector. Unemployment runs as high as 40% in at least seven Arab nations. Social investing should be planned in order to produce more entrepreneurs, engineers, scientists, and MBA graduates and expand the middle class.
- Raising competitiveness also entails accelerating the privatization programs, trade liberalization, investing in the infrastructure, deepening and linking capital markets and uprooting corruption.
- Facilitate the usage and penetration of new technologies. This would enhance the free flow of ideas, information and harness the forces of entrepreneurship. New technologies spur innovation and increase productivity which investors seek.
- Linked to this is increasing the freedom of the press and media which provides checks and balances against governments and business. New technology and freedom of the press would have a particular impact on youth and would encourage participation in the definition of future strategies at national and regional levels. Cooperation among Middle Eastern countries would be enhanced, advancing towards the knowledge economy. Increasing the use of new technologies would also reduce bureaucratic hurdles often cited by businesses as deterrents to investment.

== See also ==
- African Economic Community
- Arab Cooperation Council
- Arab Maghreb Union
- Arab Union
- Cooperation Council for the Arab States of the Gulf
- Council of Arab Economic Unity
- Economic integration
- Economy of the Arab League
- Economy of the Middle East
- Economy of the Organisation of Islamic Cooperation
- Euro-Mediterranean free trade area
- List of free trade agreements
- List of Trade blocs
- Middle East and globalization
- Middle East Economic Association
- Pan-Arabism
- Pan-Islamism
- South-South Cooperation
- U.S.–Middle East Free Trade Area
