= List of Arab League countries by GDP =

List of Arab League countries by GDP may refer to:

- List of Arab League countries by GDP (nominal), a list using the current exchange rates for national currencies
- List of Arab League countries by GDP (PPP), a list using purchasing power parity to derive GDP estimates
