= Education in the member states of the Organisation of Islamic Cooperation =

The public spending on education in the 57 Organisation of Islamic Cooperation (OIC) countries is one of the lowest in the world.

== Statistics ==
=== Public expenditure on education (% of GDP) ===
Rank	Country	Expenditure on education (% of GDP)	Year
	Kuwait	3.8	2012
	Maldives	7.2	2012
	Tunisia	6.2	2012
	Malaysia	5.1	2012
	Morocco	5.4	2012
	Djibouti	8.4	2012
	Guyana	3.6	2012
	Uganda	3.3	2012
	Iran	4.7	2012
	Oman	4.3	2012
	Kyrgyzstan	5.8	2012
	Senegal	7.1	2014
	Comoros	7.6	2012
	Cameroon	3.0	2013
	Turkey	4.4	2014
	Mauritania	3.7	2012
	Azerbaijan	3.0	2015
	Benin	5.3	2012
	Albania	3.5	2014
	Tajikistan	5.2	2015
	Lebanon	2.3	2013
	Togo	4.6	2012
	Kazakhstan	3.0	2016
	Niger	6.0	2015
	Bangladesh	2.2	2012
	Pakistan	2.8	2017
	Gambia	3.9	2012
	United Arab Emirates	1.3	2000
	Indonesia	3.6	2015
	Afghanistan	3.1	2012
	Algeria	4.3	2012
	Bahrain	2.7	2016
	Brunei	3.3	2012
	Burkina Faso	4.2	2015
	Chad	2.9	2013
	Ivory Coast	4.8	2015
	Egypt	3.8	2012
	Gabon	2.7	2014
	Guinea	3.1	2012
	Guinea-Bissau	2.1	2012
	Iraq	3.5	1989
	Jordan	4.9	1999
	Libya	2.3	1999
	Mali	4.7	2012
	Mozambique	6.5	2014
	Nigeria	3.1	1975
	Palestine	6.9	2017
	Qatar	3.6	2014
	Saudi Arabia	5.6	2012
	Sierra Leone	2.7	2012
	Somalia	7.8	2017
	Sudan	2.2	2008
	Suriname	9.8	1985
	Syria	5.1	2012
	Turkmenistan	3.0	2012
	Uzbekistan	7.4	1995
	Yemen	5.2	2012
	OIC Median	4.4	3.7

(Note: Human Development Report 2006)

=== Scientifically productive countries ===
Rank	Country	10-yr Publications	Top discipline
1	Turkey	82,407	Surgery
2	Egypt	27,723	Applied Mathematics
3	Iran	19,114	Chemistry
4	Saudi Arabia	17,472	Gen - Internal Medicine
5	Malaysia	10,674	Crystallography
6	Morocco	10,113	Physical Chemistry
7	Nigeria	9,105	Food Science & Technology
8	Pakistan	7,832	Plant Sciences
9	Jordan	6,384	Chemical Engineering
10	Kuwait	5,930	Gen - Internal Medicine

(Note: Promoting Scientific Innovation in the Muslim World By Athar Osama, and COMSTECH As measured by publications frequency between 1995-2005)

=== Most productive universities in OIC ===
Rank	University	Country	Publications
1	University Hacettepe	Turkey	8,971
2	University Istanbul	Turkey	6,488
3	Ankara University	Turkey	5,982
4	Cairo University	Egypt	4,977
5	Kuwait University	Kuwait	4,495
6	King Saud University	Saudi Arabia	4,336
7	Middle Eastern Technical U.	Turkey	4,215
8	Gazi University	Turkey	3,652
9	Istanbul Technical U.	Turkey	3,452
10	Ege University	Turkey	3,336
11	King Fahd University	Saudi Arabia	3,323
12	Ains Shams University	Egypt	3,129
13	University Malaya	Malaysia	2,862
14	National Research Center	Egypt	2,651
15	Alexandria University	Egypt	2,628
16	American University Beirut	Lebanon	2,568
17	Atatürk University	Turkey	2,535
18	United Arab Emirates U.	UAE	2,478
19	Mansoura University	Egypt	2,439
20	King Faisal Research Center	Saudi Arabia	2,434
21	University Sains Malaysia	Malaysia	2,402
22	Dokuz Eylul University	Turkey	2,389
23	Uzbek Academy of Science	Uzbekistan	2,169
24	Cukurova University	Turkey	2,026
25	University of Tehran	Iran	1,962

(Note: Promoting Scientific Innovation in the Muslim World By Athar Osama, and COMSTECH As Ten-year Publication Rate (1995-2005))

== See also ==
- List of Organisation of Islamic Cooperation member states by population
- Economy of the Organisation of Islamic Cooperation
- Islamic Educational, Scientific and Cultural Organization
