= Miftah =

Miftah (Arabic: مفتاح) may refer to:

== People ==
=== Given name ===
- Md. Miftah Uddin Choudhury, Bangladeshi judge
- Miftah al-Osta Omar, Libyan politician
- Miftah Anwar Sani, Indonesian professional footballer
- Miftah Ismail, Pakistani politician and political economist
- Miftah Maulana Habiburrohman, Indonesian preacher
- Miftah Muhammed K'eba, Libyan politician
- Mustafa Miftah Bel'id al-Dersi, Libyan politician

=== Surname ===
- Abdul Baqi Miftah, Algerian Islamic scholar of Sufism
- Hicham Miftah, Moroccan footballer
- Muhammad Miftah, Yemeni politician (born 1967)

== Other ==
- Al Miftah District, a district of the Hajjah Governorate in Yemen

== See also ==
- Meftah (disambiguation)
