= List of Arab League countries by GDP (nominal) =

This article lists the countries of the Arab League sorted by their gross domestic product (GDP) at nominal values. GDP is the value of all final goods and services produced within a nation in a given year. The table below shows the nominal GDP and GDP per capita for the 22 member states of the Arab League in 2025. The figures shown are estimates compiled by the International Monetary Fund's World Economic Outlook.

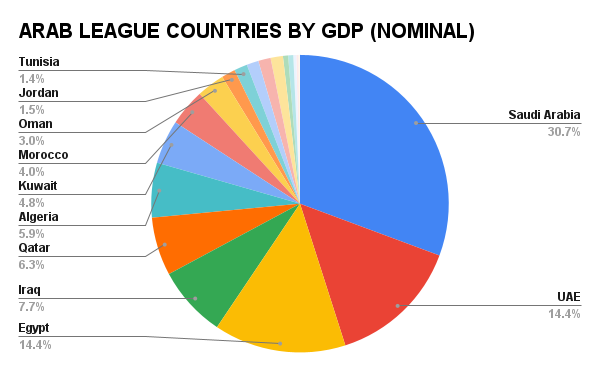
Pie chart showing show share of nominal (GDP) of Arab League member countries

== List ==
GDP 2025
Roms.	Country/Territory	Total GDP (US$)	GDP per capita (US$)
—	World	126,295.331	14,217
—	Arab World	4,148.370 (Note: The sum of all GDP figures below.)	8,911
1	Saudi Arabia	1.32 trillion	37,536
2	United Arab Emirates	601.16 billion	51,935
3	Egypt	429.645 billion	3,904
4	Algeria	317.173 billion	6,628
5	Iraq	273.91 billion	5,706
6	Qatar	239.14 billion	75,269
7	Morocco	194.333 billion	5,107
8	Kuwait	162.90 billion	33,164
9	Oman	108.91 billion	20,304
10	Jordan	59.29 billion	5,156
11	Tunisia	60.745 billion	4,893
12	Syria	17.25 billion	847
13	Libya	52.453 billion	6,962
14	Bahrain	49.19 billion	32,793
15	Sudan	44.688 billion	864
16	Lebanon	28.28 billion	5,050
17	Yemen	17.24 billion	431
18	Mauritania	14.352 billion	3,033
19	Somalia	14.174 billion	813
20	Palestine	13.71 billion	2,493
21	Djibouti	4.725 billion	4,421
22	Comoros	1.814 billion	1,951

== See also ==
- List of Arab League countries by GDP (PPP)
- Economy of the Arab League
