= COMSTECH =

Organization in Islamabad, Pakistan

Standing Committee for Scientific and Technological Cooperation (COMSTECH) is one of four standing committees of the Organisation of Islamic Cooperation dedicated to the promotion and cooperation of science and technology activities among the OIC member states.

== Foundation ==
COMSTECH was established by the OIC's Islamic Summit in Mecca on 1981 and comprises the OIC member states for the sake of building on indigenous capabilities in science and technology, promotion and cooperation in relevant areas, and establishment of institutional structure for planning and development at Ummah level.

== Objectives ==
Their stated objectives are:

- Assessment of the human and material resources of OIC member states and determination of science and technology needs and requirements.
- Building up the indigenous capability of member states in the fields of science and technology through cooperation and mutual assistance.
- Promotion of cooperation and coordination amongst the member states in science and technology. Creation of an effective institutional structure of planning, research and development and monitoring of science and technology activities in high technology areas.

== Inter-Library Resource Network ==
The Inter-Library Resource Network Service is a programme that networks libraries of the OIC member states, requiring all member institutions to provide free access to the users of other members.

In 2007 the journal holdings of 45 libraries from 15 OIC members had been networked, and the same figures were reported in early 2009. As of 2009, COMSTECH lists the following 48 libraries as part of the network:

1. Al Al-Bayt University, Amman, Jordan
2. Abdullahi Fodiyo Library Complex, Usmanu Danfodiyo University, Sokoto, Nigeria
3. Allama I.I. Kazi Library, University of Sindh, Jamshoro, Pakistan
4. Applied Sciences University, Amman, Jordan
5. Arid Agriculture University, Rawalpindi, Pakistan.
6. Bangladesh Agriculture University, Mymensingh, Bangladesh
7. Bangladesh Council of Scientific and Industrial Research (BCSIR) Library, Dhaka, Bangladesh
8. Bangladesh Institute of Research & Rehabilitation in Diabetes, Endocrine & Metabolic Disorders (BIRDEM) Shahbagh, Dhaka, Bangladesh
9. Bangladesh National Scientific and Technical Documentation Centre (BANSDOC) Library, Mirpore Road, Dhanmondi, Dhaka-1205, Bangladesh
10. Bangladesh University of Engineering & Technology, Dhaka, Bangladesh
11. Bangladesh University of Science & Technology, Dhaka, Bangladesh
12. Bilkent University, Ankara, Turkey
13. Central Library, Bahauddin Zakariya University, Multan, Pakistan
14. Central Library, N.W.F.P. University of Engineering & Technology, Peshawar, Pakistan
15. Dhaka Medical College, Dhaka, Bangladesh
16. Dhaka University Library, Dhaka, Bangladesh
17. Dr. Raziuddin Siddiqi Memorial Library, Quaid-e-Azam University, Islamabad, Pakistan
18. HEJ Research Institute of Chemistry, University of Karachi, Karachi, Pakistan
19. Institut Teknologi Sepuluh Nopember, Sukolilo, East Java, Indonesia
20. International Center for Agricultural Research in the Dry Areas (ICARDA), Aleppo, Syria
21. International Centre for Diarrhoeal Disease Research, Bangladesh (ICDDRB)
22. International Institute of Earthquake Engineering and Seismology (IIEES), Iran
23. International Islamic University, Islamabad, Pakistan
24. Iranian University of Science & Technology, Tehran, Iran
25. Jordan University of Science & Technology, Jordan
26. King Abdul Aziz City for Science and Technology (KACST), Saudi Arabia
27. Kuwait Institute for Scientific Research (KISR)
28. Lahore University of Management Sciences (LUMS), Graduate School of Business Administration, Lahore Pakistan
29. Mohammad V University, Rabat, Morocco
30. Ondokuz Mayıs University, Kurupelit, Samsun 55139, Turkey
31. Pakistan Institute of Nuclear Science and Technology, Nilore, Islamabad, Pakistan
32. Shah Abdul Latif University, Khairpur Sindh, Pakistan
33. Regional Information Center for Science & Technology, Shiraz University, Shiraz, Iran
34. Sultan Qaboos University, Musqat, Oman
35. Universitas Katolik Indonesia Atma Jaya, Jakarta, Indonesia
36. Universite Cheikh Anta Diop, Dakar, Senegal
37. Universite De Saint-Louis, Saint-Louis, Senegal
38. Universiti Sains Malaysia, Penang, Malaysia
39. University of Agriculture, Faisalabad, Pakistan
40. University of Peshawar, Peshawar, Pakistan
41. University of Punjab, Lahore, Pakistan
42. University of Qatar, Doha, Qatar
43. University of Uyo, Uyo, Akwa Ibom State, Nigeria.
44. Usmanu Danfodiyo University Library, Sokoto, Nigeria
45. Yarmouk University, Irbid, Jordan
46. Satellite Research & Development Center, Lahore
47. Institute of Space Technology, Islamabad
48. Space and Atmospheric Research Centre Library, Space and Upper Atmosphere Research Commission, Karachi, Pakistan

== See also ==
- Economy of the Organisation of Islamic Cooperation
