= MEFTA =

MEFTA may refer to:

- U.S.–Middle East Free Trade Area (US-MEFTA), started in 2003 to create a U.S. Middle East Free Trade Area by 2013
- Euro-Mediterranean free trade area (EU-MEFTA), Euromed FTA, based on the Barcelona Process and European Neighbourhood Policy
- Greater Arab Free Trade Area (GAFTA) in the Middle East region

== See also ==
- Meftah (disambiguation)
