= List of Organisation of Islamic Cooperation member states by exports =

This article includes a list of 57 member states of the Organisation of Islamic Cooperation sorted by their exports.

Rank	State	Exports (US $)	Date of Est.
1	United Arab Emirates	308,500,000,000	2017
2	Malaysia	207,370,000,000	2020
3	Turkey	203,290,000,000	2020
4	Saudi Arabia	184,110,000,000	2020
5	Indonesia	178,260,000,000	2020
6	Iran	101,400,000,000	2017
7	Kuwait	72,830,000,000	2019
8	Qatar	70,930,000,000	2020
9	Kazakhstan	51,750,000,000	2020
10	Iraq	50,610,000,000	2020
11	Oman	43,690,000,000	2019
12	Egypt	40,100,000,000	2020
13	Nigeria	39,940,000,000	2020
14	Bangladesh	38,780,000,000	2020
15	Algeria	38,320,000,000	2019
16	Morocco	37,520,000,000	2020
17	Bahrain	30,100,000,000	2018
18	Pakistan	36,750,000,000	2021
19	Libya	29,960,000,000	2018
20	Tunisia	19,170,000,000	2019
21	Lebanon	18,170,000,000	2019
22	Jordan	16,290,000,000	2019
23	Azerbaijan	15,210,000,000	2020
24	Uzbekistan	14,520,000,000	2020
25	Ivory Coast	13,790,000,000	2019
26	Gabon	10,800,000,000	2019
27	Brunei	7,830,000,000	2019
28	Cameroon	7,730,000,000	2019
29	Turkmenistan	7,458,000,000	2017
30	Uganda	6,120,000,000	2019
31	Senegal	5,290,000,000	2018
32	Djibouti	5,150,000,000	2019
33	Sudan	5,110,000,000	2019
34	Burkina Faso	4,470,000,000	2019
35	Mozambique	4,350,000,000	2020
36	Mali	4,180,000,000	2018
37	Guinea	4,040,000,000	2019
38	Maldives	3,720,000,000	2019
39	Benin	3,580,000,000	2019
40	Albania	3,470,000,000	2020
41	Kyrgyzstan	3,110,000,000	2019
42	Mauritania	2,520,000,000	2019
43	Chad	2,464,000,000	2017
44	Suriname	2,290,000,000	2019
45	Syria	1,850,000,000	2017
46	Guyana	1,800,000,000	2019
47	Togo	1,670,000,000	2019
48	Afghanistan	1,480,000,000	2020
49	Tajikistan	1,410,000,000	2020
50	Niger	1,390,000,000	2019
51	Somalia	819,000,000	2014
52	Sierra Leone	740,000,000	2019
53	Yemen	384,500,000	2017
54	Gambia	350,000,000	2018
55	Guinea-Bissau	290,000,000	2019
56	Comoros	140,000,000	2019
57	Palestine		

== See also ==
- Organisation of Islamic Cooperation
- Economy of the Organisation of Islamic Cooperation
- List of Organisation of Islamic Cooperation member states by GDP (PPP)
- List of Organisation of Islamic Cooperation member states by GDP per capita (PPP)
- List of Organisation of Islamic Cooperation member states by imports
