= List of Organisation of Islamic Cooperation member states by GDP (PPP) =

This article includes a list of 57 member states of the Organisation of Islamic Cooperation (OIC) sorted by their gross domestic product (GDP) at purchasing power parity (PPP), the value of all final goods and services produced within a nation in a given year.

Country	GDP (USD bln, 2012)	GDP (USD bln, 2017)	GDP (USD PPP bln, 2012)	GDP (USD PPP bln, 2017)	Per capita (USD, 2012)	Per capita (USD, 2017)	Per capita (USD PPP, 2012)	Per capita (USD PPP, 2017)
Afghanistan	19.85	28.45	31.80	45.30	619.89	766.43	993.23	1,220.52
Albania	12.39	14.75	25.86	31.55	3,821.09	4,435.73	7,975.86	9,489.11
Algeria	206.55	242.31	274.50	356.26	5,659.74	6,163.52	7,521.74	9,061.86
Azerbaijan	71.04	109.95	98.24	123.35	7,726.65	11,491.29	10,684.95	12,891.89
Bahrain	26.51	30.36	32.44	40.37	23,027.12	23,889.03	28,182.13	31,765.11
Bangladesh	118.69	268.61	305.51	751.42	791.09	1,122.90	2,036.23	2,922.78
Benin	7.54	11.14	15.51	20.74	806.38	1,048.35	1,658.02	1,952.09
Brunei Darussalam	16.85	18.15	21.94	28.31	38,801.27	37,516.64	50,526.35	58,522.83
Burkina Faso	10.27	15.28	24.03	36.52	591.83	785.64	1,384.18	1,877.68
Cameroon	24.51	34.16	50.32	70.79	1,142.25	1,407.23	2,345.29	2,915.94
Chad	9.72	10.96	21.34	27.02	905.32	899.03	1,986.44	2,217.06
Comoros	0.60	0.83	0.87	1.15	857.75	1,079.12	1,255.98	1,488.46
Côte d'Ivoire	24.27	37.03	39.64	61.66	1,038.74	1,366.89	1,696.15	2,276.02
Djibouti	1.36	2.00	2.38	3.36	1,570.59	2,039.31	2,745.19	3,431.50
Egypt	255.00	339.33	537.76	756.42	3,109.47	3,729.36	6,557.38	8,313.47
Gabon	16.80	18.00	26.71	32.68	10,908.38	10,881.51	17,338.98	19,762.74
The Gambia	0.94	1.39	3.50	5.38	508.68	657.09	1,891.76	2,548.81
Guinea	5.74	10.66	12.25	24.14	529.20	868.20	1,128.63	1,965.65
Guinea-Bissau	0.88	1.29	1.90	2.79	514.14	671.22	1,105.55	1,453.15
Guyana	2.79	3.98	6.16	8.49	3,596.44	5,053.25	7,950.28	10,788.87
Indonesia	894.85	1,842.78	1,211.96	1,814.58	3,660.42	7,022.67	4,957.55	6,915.24
Iran	483.78	671.01	1,006.54	1,173.48	6,355.74	8,269.55	13,103.90	14,462.05
Iraq	130.57	214.36	155.38	283.34	3,882.08	5,744.21	4,619.68	7,592.46
Jordan	31.35	46.33	38.67	51.61	4,901.28	6,464.77	6,044.40	7,201.71
Kazakhstan	200.64	339.57	232.35	339.77	12,021.22	20,243.27	13,920.87	20,255.29
Kuwait	174.63	193.10	165.94	212.73	46,142.29	44,467.96	43,846.72	48,990.11
Kyrgyz Republic	6.20	9.58	13.47	19.45	1,109.09	1,632.03	2,411.04	3,311.42
Lebanon	41.77	56.25	63.69	82.99	10,416.17	13,149.68	15,884.07	19,401.42
Libya	85.11	117.76	87.91	145.08	12,878.85	16,141.08	13,303.20	19,886.33
Malaysia	307.18	465.14	491.97	680.30	10,578.45	14,723.61	16,942.14	21,534.22
Maldives	1.98	2.69	2.89	3.67	5,976.79	7,473.76	8,730.17	10,217.39
Mali	9.60	13.39	17.35	24.27	587.49	702.87	1,061.75	1,273.87
Mauritania	4.10	5.64	7.62	10.97	1,128.91	1,380.28	2,098.81	2,686.63
Morocco	97.17	140.01	170.95	242.78	2,987.92	4,099.70	5,256.55	7,109.34
Mozambique	14.64	23.76	26.22	41.71	652.00	958.25	1,167.30	1,682.38
Niger	6.56	9.65	13.53	20.29	421.56	532.81	869.94	1,120.09
Nigeria	272.55	388.42	450.54	676.25	1,654.31	2,058.57	2,734.63	3,584.02
Oman	79.97	89.97	90.66	117.23	25,151.54	24,323.53	28,511.86	31,693.79
Pakistan	224.53	305.82	791.56	1,116.44	1,266.50	1,574.71	4,380.08	5,188.13
Qatar	184.57	237.85	188.96	274.46	100,377.54	106,320.28	102,768.69	122,684.13
Saudi Arabia	657.05	778.75	740.53	985.79	22,822.82	24,428.39	25,722.42	30,922.92
Senegal	13.95	19.55	26.50	37.10	1,013.34	1,261.40	1,925.30	2,393.44
Sierra Leone	3.82	5.71	8.38	12.78	621.22	816.31	1,360.58	1,825.47
Sudan	51.58	57.89	80.43	102.35	1,539.31	1,519.50	2,400.17	2,686.33
Suriname	5.09	8.06	6.69	9.19	9,338.99	13,821.78	12,255.19	15,755.24
Syria	n/a	n/a	n/a	n/a	n/a	n/a	n/a	n/a
Tajikistan	7.26	10.91	17.61	25.60	911.98	1,235.12	2,210.56	2,897.11
Togo	3.62	4.67	6.90	9.75	574.95	664.32	1,094.46	1,385.73
Tunisia	44.70	54.84	104.41	143.65	4,151.92	4,835.23	9,698.13	12,665.06
Turkey	783.06	1,170.08	1,125.42	1,497.09	10,456.89	14,748.21	15,028.63	18,870.00
Turkmenistan	33.47	83.42	47.55	75.38	5,960.67	13,724.21	8,469.10	12,401.85
Uganda	20.46	29.89	50.59	75.86	574.07	712.81	1,419.17	1,809.06
United Arab Emirates	361.91	430.53	271.21	345.14	65,377.09	67,348.58	48,992.47	53,990.11
Uzbekistan	51.62	79.73	103.91	151.81	1,752.90	2,550.49	3,528.60	4,856.52
Yemen	36.37	53.00	57.76	78.18	1,405.13	1,768.01	2,231.69	2,608.10

== Notes ==
- IMF, October 2012

== See also ==
- Organisation of Islamic Cooperation
- Economy of the Organisation of Islamic Cooperation
- List of Organisation of Islamic Cooperation member states by GDP per capita (PPP)
- List of Organisation of Islamic Cooperation member states by exports
- List of Organisation of Islamic Cooperation member states by imports
