= Arab Federation for Digital Economy =

- الاتحاد العربي للاقتصاد الرقمي
- Abbreviation: AFDE
- Formation: April 2018; 8 years ago
- Type: NGO
- Headquarters: Abu Dhabi, UAE
- Chairman: Ali El-Khouri
- Website: arabfde.org

The Arab Federation for Digital Economy (AFDE) (Arabic: الاتحاد العربي للاقتصاد الرقمي) is an Arab organization affiliated with the Arab League that aims to support the development that is related to the fields and uses of the digital economy in the Arab World.

The Arab Federation for Digital Economy was established in April 2018 by the Council of Arab Economic Unity, and it joined the Arab League's specialized federations in 2021, and the membership of the Executive Office in 2021, to work under the direct supervision of the Secretary-General of the Arab League.

== Establishment ==
The Arab Federation for Digital Economy was established in April 2018 by the Council of Arab Economic Unity. It joined the specialized Arab federations affiliated with the League of Arab States in 2021, and became a member of the Executive Office in 2021, operating under the direct supervision of the Secretary-General of the League of Arab States.
