= List of Organisation of Islamic Cooperation member states by GDP per capita (PPP) =

This article includes a list of 57 member states of the Organisation of Islamic Cooperation sorted by their gross domestic product (GDP) at purchasing power parity (PPP) per capita, the value of all final goods and services produced within a nation in a given year divided by the average population for the same year. 9 countries- Benin, Cameroon, Gabon, Guyana, Ivory Coast, Mozambique, Suriname, Togo and Uganda are not Muslim-majority, but they are members of Organisation of Islamic Cooperation.

Member state	GDP per capita (PPP) (U.S. dollars)
Afghanistan	1,889
Albania	12,472
Algeria	15,150
Azerbaijan	17,433
Bahrain	51,846
Bangladesh	4,207
Benin	2,219
Brunei Darussalam	76,743
Burkina Faso	1,884
Cameroon	3,359
Chad	2,433
Comoros	1,560
Côte d'Ivoire	3,857
Djibouti	3,567
Egypt	12,994
Gabon	19,266
The Gambia	1,686
Guinea	2,039
Guinea-Bissau	1,806
Guyana	8,266
Indonesia	12,378
Iran	20,030
Iraq	17,004
Jordan	12,487
Kazakhstan	26,071
Kuwait	69,669
Kyrgyz Republic	3,652
Lebanon	19,486
Libya	9,792
Malaysia	28,871
Maldives	19,178
Mali	2,169
Mauritania	4,474
Morocco	8,612
Mozambique	1,266
Niger	1,153
Nigeria	5,927
Oman	45,464
Pakistan	5,354
Palestine	1,888
Qatar	124,927
Saudi Arabia	55,263
Senegal	2,678
Sierra Leone	1,791
Somalia	600
Sudan	4,580
Suriname	13,876
Syria	5,040
Tajikistan	3,131
Togo	1,612
Tunisia	11,987
Turkey	26,453
Turkmenistan	18,680
Uganda	2,352
United Arab Emirates	68,245
Uzbekistan	6,990
Yemen	2,300
OIC	15,966

== Notes ==
- IMF - October 2012

== See also ==
- Economy of the Organisation of Islamic Cooperation
- List of Organisation of Islamic Cooperation member states by GDP (PPP)
- List of Organisation of Islamic Cooperation member states by exports
- List of Organisation of Islamic Cooperation member states by imports
