= List of Organisation of Islamic Cooperation member states by imports =

This article includes a list of 57 member states of the Organisation of Islamic Cooperation sorted by their imports.

Rank	State	Imports (US $)
1	Turkey	228,900,000,000
2	Malaysia	118,700,000,000
3	Indonesia	62,020,000,000
4	United Arab Emirates	60,150,000,000
5	Saudi Arabia	44,930,000,000
6	Iran	42,500,000,000
7	Nigeria	25,950,000,000
8	Egypt	24,100,000,000
9	Algeria	22,530,000,000
10	Pakistan	21,260,000,000
11	Iraq	19,570,000,000
12	Morocco	18,150,000,000
13	Bangladesh	17,510,000,000
14	Kazakhstan	12,970,000,000
15	Tunisia	12,860,000,000
16	Kuwait	12,230,000,000
17	Libya	10,820,000,000
18	Lebanon	8,855,000,000
19	Oman	8,709,000,000
20	Jordan	8,681,000,000
21	Bahrain	7,830,000,000
22	Qatar	6,706,000,000
23	Syria	5,973,000,000
24	Sudan	5,028,000,000
25	Azerbaijan	4,759,000,000
26	Ivory Coast	4,656,000,000
27	Turkmenistan	4,190,000,000
28	Afghanistan	4,175,000,000
29	Yemen	3,870,000,000
30	Cameroon	3,800,000,000
31	Uzbekistan	2,514,000,000
32	Albania	2,473,000,000
33	Senegal	2,405,000,000
34	Mozambique	2,041,000,000
35	Mali	1,858,000,000
36	Brunei	1,641,000,000
37	Uganda	1,608,000,000
38	Gabon	1,533,000,000
39	Mauritania	1,250,000,000
40	Tajikistan	1,124,000,000
41	Togo	1,047,000,000
42	Benin	1,043,000,000
43	Burkina Faso	992,000,000
44	Kyrgyzstan	987,000,000
45	Suriname	937,400,000
46	Djibouti	750,000,000
47	Chad	749,100,000
48	Guyana	681,600,000
49	Guinea	680,000,000
50	Niger	588,000,000
51	Somaliland	576,000,000
52	Maldives	567,000,000
53	Sierra Leone	531,000,000
54	Gambia	197,000,000
55	Guinea-Bissau	176,000,000
56	Comoros	115,000,000
57	Palestine	

== See also ==
- Organisation of Islamic Cooperation
- Economy of the Organisation of Islamic Cooperation
- List of Organisation of Islamic Cooperation member states by GDP (PPP)
- List of Organisation of Islamic Cooperation member states by GDP per capita (PPP)
- List of Organisation of Islamic Cooperation member states by exports
