= Economy of the Organisation of Islamic Cooperation =

The economy of the Organisation of Islamic Cooperation (OIC) combines the economies of 57 member states. 49 are predominantly Muslim states. As of 2013, the combined GDP (nominal) of 51 Muslim majority countries was US$12.97 trillion. As of 2016, they contributed 8% of the world's total. Those 57 OIC countries in 2024 have a combined GDP (at Purchasing power parity; PPP) of US$ 24.183 trillion or US$ 29.983 trillion with observer countries. The largest economy based on total PPP and Nominal GDP is Indonesia. The richest country on the basis of GDP per capita at PPP is Qatar, with incomes exceeding $133,357 per capita. On the basis of per capita GDP, Qatar is also the richest country, with incomes exceeding US$68,977 per capita. According to a report by Salam Standard, the GDP impact of the world's Muslim tourism sector exceeded $138 billion in 2015, generating 4.3 million jobs and contributing more than $18 billion in tax revenue. The following calcluations are strictly based on basic GDP measures.

	GDP (nominal)	GDP (PPP)	GDP / capita	GDP / capita (PPP)	Exports	Imports	HDI	HDI Category	Life Expectancy
Indonesia	1,540,000,000,000	5,550,000,000,000	5,326	19,611	298,000,000,000	263,000,000,000	▲0.728	High	71.29
Saudi Arabia	1,389,000,000,000	2,895,000,000,000	33,291	65,880	370,900,000,000	291,000,000,000	▲0.900	High	78.98
Turkey	1,650,000,000,000	4,025,000,000,000	16,709	41,913	262,000,000,000	344,000,000,000	▲0.853	High	77.42
Iran	500,000,000,000	1,782,000,000,000	5,300	20,369	107,000,000,000	54,000,000,000	▲0.799	High	77.85
Bangladesh	510,000,000,000	1,922,000,000,000	2,773	10,370	60,500,000,000	70,100,000,000	▲0.685	High	74.93
Egypt	429,870,000,000	2,570,000,000,000	3,161 (2017 est)	21,610	51,000,000,000	88,000,000,000	▲0.754	High	71.81
Pakistan	500,500,000,000	2,110,000,000,000	1,710	6,950	41,940,000,000	40,580,000,000	▲0.544	High	88.8
Malaysia	516,700,000,000	1,600,000,000,000	14,423	43,095	340,200,000,000	300,900,000,000	▲0.819	High	76.82
United Arab Emirates	657,000,000,000	1,000,000,000,000	51,290	82,000	306,700,000,000	229,000,000,000	▲0.940	High	83.07
Algeria	331,270,000,000	1,000,720,000,000	5,590	18,340	60,000,000,000	29,000,000,000	▲0.763	High	76.47
Iraq	270,870,000,000	1,000,000,000,000	5,923	15,260	127,079,000,000	69,162,000,000	▲0.695	High	72.42
Kazakhstan	400,000,000,000	1,000,000,000,000	14,788	41,366	78,700,000,000	61,200,000,000	▲0.837	High	74.53
Kuwait	160,100,000,000	260,403,000,000	32,289	51,200	95,476,000,000	63,430,000,000	▲0.852	High	84.58
Qatar	240,217,000,000	369,240,000,000	72,760	118,760	86,510,000,000	26,690,000,000	▲0.886	High	82.52
Morocco	200,600,000,000	500,450,000,000	4,670	11,100	45,690,000,000	76,410,000,000	▲0.710	High	75.49
Oman	188,000,000,000	222,060,000,000	20,631	41,652	69,701,000,000	46,326,000,000	▲0.858	High	80.25
Libya	46,923,000,000	168,371,000,000	7,133	12,073	19,720,000,000	10,820,000,000	▼0.721	High	71.12
Uzbekistan	181,892,000,000	552,000,000,000	1,455	7,791	11,380,000,000	3,800,000,000	▲0.740	High	72.53
Azerbaijan	80,926,500,000	190,237,000,000	4,764	18,911	15,690,000,000	10,060,000,000	▲0.789	High	74.58
Tunisia	60,956,700,000	149,094,000,000	3,568	12,682	14,220,000,000	12,860,000,000	▲0.746	High	76.71
Yemen	17,452,500,000	47,304,000,000	551	1,494	501,200,000	4,190,000,000	▲0.470	Low	69.44
Sudan	43,160,800,000	209,751,000,000	992	4,724	3,808,000,000	6,823,000,000	▲0.511	Low	66.52
Lebanon	56,379,400,000	94,661,000,000	11,775	19,987	4,051,000,000	8,855,000,000	▼0.752	High	77.94
Jordan	65,794,500,000	98,001,000,000	6,011	13,151	7,734,000,000	8,681,000,000	▲0.754	High	77.98
Syria	77,460,000,000 (2015 est)	121,600,000,000 (2009 est)	1,364 (2015 est)	2,900 (2009 est)	1,786,000,000	5,973,000,000	▼0.564	Medium	72.56
Turkmenistan	80,401,900,000	121,303,000,000	7,963	20,817	7,394,000,000	4,175,000,000	▲0.764	High	70.20
Afghanistan	22,925,700,000	76,714,000,000	627	2,101	784,000,000	3,870,000,000	▼0.496	Low	66.29
Cameroon	60,748,000,000	100,920,000,000	1,636	3,956	5,158,000,000	2,514,000,000	▲0.588	Medium	63.97
Ivory Coast	95,979,300,000	116,397,000,000	2,016	4,430	11,080,000,000	4,759,000,000	▲0.582	Medium	62.11
Uganda	64,690,000,000	103,138,000,000	742	2,578	2,902,000,000	1,608,000,000	▲0.582	Medium	68.49
Bahrain	47,703,100,000	77,590,000,000	26,277	51,354	14,330,000,000	7,830,000,000	▲0.899	High	81.42
Senegal	34,722,700,000	51,758,000,000	1,293	3,082	2,546,000,000	2,405,000,000	▲0.530	Low	68.92
Albania	33,146,900,000	40,451,000,000	5,626	14,095	960,900,000	2,473,000,000	▲0.810	High	79.78
Gabon	20,096,500,000	40,871,000,000	9,233	20,854	5,078,000,000	1,533,000,000	▲0.733	High	68.51
Mozambique	15,017,000,000	40,506,000,000	481	1,300	4,773,000,000	2,041,000,000	▲0.493	Low	63.80
Brunei	16,791,100,000	38,216,000,000	33,623	86,873	5,776,000,000	1,641,000,000	▼0.837	High	75.50
Burkina Faso	15,867,600,000	42,026,000,000	793	2,101	2,797,000,000	992,000,000	▲0.459	Low	61.29
Chad	12,240,900,000	31,759,000,000	956	2,480	2,438,000,000	749,100,000	▲0.416	Low	55.24
Mali	19,247,700,000	47,097,000,000	954	2,336	3,036,000,000	1,858,000,000	▲0.419	Low	60.67
Tajikistan	8,176,100,000	32,077,000,000	887	3,482	794,700,000	1,250,000,000	▲0.691	Medium	71.93
Benin	12,200,000,000	29,845,000,000	1,040	2,546	1,760,000,000	1,043,000,000	▲0.515	Low	60.96
Kyrgyzstan	8,029,300,000	26,030,000,000	1,231	3,994	1,768,000,000	937,400,000	▲0.720	High	72.40
Niger	10,717,700,000	25,274,000,000	537	1,267	1,177,000,000	588,000,000	▲0.419	Low	61.43
Guinea	11,698,800,000	30,980,000,000	858	2,273	2,115,000,000	680,000,000	▲0.500	Low	60.90
Mauritania	5,540,500,000	19,342,000,000	1,365	4,765	1,606,000,000	1,124,000,000	▲0.563	Medium	68.71
Sierra Leone	3,976,200,000	13,134,000,000	513	1,697	836,800,000	531,000,000	▲0.467	Low	61.96
Togo	6,078,600,000	14,925,000,000	740	1,819	1,002,000,000	1,047,000,000	▲0.571	Medium	62.94
Suriname	4,226,900,000	9,197,200,000	7,076	15,398	1,976,000,000	750,000,000	▲0.722	High	73.76
Guyana	3,911,700,000	7,050,000,000	5,046	9,097	1,474,000,000	681,600,000	▲0.776	High	70.32
Somalia	8,210,000,000	20,560,000,000	744	1,863	819,000,000	576,000,000	▲0.404	Low	58.97
Maldives	5,169,800,000	7,935,500,000	13,902	21,344	256,200,000	567,000,000	▲0.766	High	81.28
Gambia	1,159,290,000	4,174,000,000	517	1,865	109,700,000	197,000,000	▲0.524	Low	66.06
Guinea-Bissau	1,728,651,000	3,648,200,000	972	2,054	281,200,000	176,000,000	▲0.514	Low	64.25
Djibouti	2,380,300,000	4,321,500,000	2,207	4,006	155,500,000	987,000,000	▲0.513	Low	66.20
Comoros	781,300,900	1,457,000,000	894	1,669	18,400,000	115,000,000	▲0.603	Medium	67.02
Palestine	9,828,000,000	21,220,000,000	3,576	7,722	1,955,000,000	6,476,000,000	▼0.674	Medium	69.21
OIC	9,428,050,000,000	30,250,400,000,000	4,187	13,358	1,746,527,600,000	1,620,011,100,000	▲0.702	High	
OIC (% of World)	9.49%	17.79%	34.00%	64.70%	8.74%	1.86%			
OIC Observers									
Russia	2,196,000,000,000	7,525,000,000,000	15,077	48,957	465,430,000,000	378,610,000,00	▲0.832	High	73.44
Thailand	545,340,000,000	1,964,000,000,000	8,900	26,416	300,520,000,000	306,800,000	▲0.798	High	76.56
Bosnia and Herzegovina	23,358,000,000	49,802,000,000	6,140	14,221	4,803,000,000	9,294,000,000	▲0.804	High	78.04
Central African Republic	2,334,200,000	3,812,000,000	450	735	118,500,000	237,300,000	▲0.414	Low	57.67
Cyprus	4,234,000,000	35,195,000,000	30,520	40,751	2,905,000,000	7,884,000,000	▲0.913	High	81.82
Nigeria	194,960,000,000	2,424,000,000,000	870	6,710	42,000,000,000	52,000,000,000	▲0.560	Medium	54.63
World	79,865,481,000,000	126,687,917,000,000	12,230	20,645	17,779,000,000,000	17,779,000,000,000	▲0.756	High	73.48

(Note: CIA - The World Factbook.)

*Observer nations in italic

Economic Growth for 5 years (GDP)

Country	2003	2004	2005	2006	2007	5 Yr Avg.
Azerbaijan	10.4	10.2	24.3	25.6	26.4	19.4
Afghanistan	15.7	8.0	14.0	12.0	11.1	12.2
Chad	14.7	31.3	12.2	0.1	2.5	12.2
Turkmenistan	17.1	14.7	9.6	9.0	9.0	11.9
United Arab Emirates	11.9	9.7	8.5	11.5	5.8	9.5
Kazakhstan	9.3	9.6	9.4	8.3	7.7	8.9
Tajikistan	10.2	10.6	6.7	8.0	6.0	8.3
Sudan	4.9	5.2	7.9	12.1	11.3	8.3
Mauritania	5.6	5.2	5.4	14.1	10.6	8.2
Kuwait	13.4	6.2	8.5	6.2	4.7	7.8
Mozambique	7.9	7.5	7.7	7.9	7.0	7.6
Sierra Leone	9.3	7.4	7.2	7.4	6.5	7.6
Nigeria	10.7	6.0	6.9	5.2	6.4	7.0
Qatar	5.9	11.2	6.5	6.7	4.7	7.0
Pakistan	4.9	7.4	8.0	6.2	7.0	6.7
Uzbekistan	4.2	7.7	7.0	7.2	7.0	6.6
Bahrain	7.2	5.4	6.9	7.1	6.3	6.6
Turkey	5.8	8.9	7.4	5.0	5.0	6.4
Saudi Arabia	7.7	5.3	6.6	5.8	6.5	6.4
Jordan	4.2	8.4	7.2	6.0	5.0	6.2
Bangladesh	5.8	6.1	6.2	6.2	6.2	6.1
Burkina Faso	7.9	4.0	7.1	5.6	5.8	6.1
Maldives	8.5	9.5	-5.5	13.0	4.0	5.9
Malaysia	5.5	7.2	5.2	5.5	5.8	5.8
Albania	5.7	5.9	5.5	5.0	6.0	5.6
Iran	6.7	5.6	5.4	5.4	4.9	5.6
Tunisia	5.6	6.0	4.2	5.8	6.0	5.5
Uganda	4.4	5.7	6.0	5.5	6.0	5.5
Algeria	6.9	5.2	5.3	4.9	5.0	5.5
Oman	2.0	5.6	6.7	7.1	5.7	5.4
Senegal	6.7	5.6	5.5	4.0	5.3	5.4
Suriname	5.3	7.8	5.1	4.5	4.4	5.4
Libya	9.1	4.6	3.5	5.0	4.6	5.4
Indonesia	4.8	5.1	5.6	5.2	6.0	5.3
Gambia	6.9	5.1	5.0	4.5	5.0	5.3
Mali	7.2	2.4	6.1	5.1	5.4	5.2
Kyrgyzstan	7.0	7.0	-0.6	5.0	5.5	4.8
Egypt	3.1	4.1	4.9	5.6	5.6	4.7
Morocco	5.5	4.2	1.7	7.3	3.3	4.4
Benin	3.9	3.1	2.9	4.5	5.1	3.9
Niger	5.3	-0.6	7.0	3.5	4.2	3.9
Cameroon	4.0	3.7	2.6	4.2	4.3	3.8
Djibouti	3.2	3.0	3.2	4.2	5.0	3.7
Guinea	1.2	2.7	3.3	5.0	5.4	3.5
Yemen	3.1	2.6	3.8	3.9	2.5	3.2
Guinea-Bissau	-0.6	2.2	3.2	4.6	5.2	2.9
Togo	1.9	3.0	0.8	4.2	4.5	2.9
Syria	1.0	3.1	2.9	3.2	3.7	2.8
Lebanon	5.0	6.0	1.0	-3.2	5.0	2.8
Gabon	2.4	1.4	2.9	2.2	2.5	2.3
Comoros	2.5	-0.2	4.2	1.2	3.0	2.1
Brunei	2.9	0.5	0.4	3.7	2.6	2.0
Ivory Coast	-1.5	1.8	1.9	1.9	3.0	1.4
Guyana	-0.7	1.6	-3.0	3.5	4.1	1.1
Iraq	-	-	-	-	-	-
Palestine	-	-	-	-	-	-
Somalia	-	-	-	-	-	-
Average	6.1	6.0	5.5	6.1	5.9	5.9

(Note: IMF - World Economic Outlook Database, September 2006, Data for Iraq, Somalia, & Palestine is not available on this site.)

== See also ==
- List of Organisation of Islamic Cooperation member states by GDP per capita (PPP)
- List of Organisation of Islamic Cooperation member states by population
- List of Organisation of Islamic Cooperation member states by GDP (PPP)
- List of Organisation of Islamic Cooperation member states by exports
- List of Organisation of Islamic Cooperation member states by imports
- Middle East economic integration
- Economy of the Arab League
- Economy of the European Union
