= Nordine Assami =

French-Algerian footballer (born 1987)

Personal information
- Full name: Nordine Assami
- Date of birth: 24 July 1987 (age 39)
- Place of birth: Marseille, France
- Height: 1.88 m (6 ft 2 in)
- Position: Defender

Team information
- Current team: SC Air Bel (U16 Manager)

Senior career*
Years	Team	Apps	(Gls)
2004–2005	Cannes	6	(0)
2005–2007	Strasbourg B	39	(2)
2007–2008	Istres	11	(0)
2008–2009	Marignane	9	(0)
2009	1. FK Příbram	1	(0)
2009–2011	Gap	56	(5)
2011–2012	JS Kabylie	5	(0)
2012–2013	GS Consolat	26	(1)
2013–2014	US Marignane	13	(1)
2014–2015	FC Martigues	22	(3)
2015–2016	GS Consolat	16	(0)
2016–2018	Aubagne FC	49	(14)
2018	FC Rousset SVO		
2018–2019	AS Gémenosienne	16	(2)

Managerial career
- 2019–: SC Air Bel (U16)
- * Club domestic league appearances and goals

Nordine Assami (born 24 July 1987) is a retired French-Algerian professional football player and current manager of SC Air Bel's U16 team.

== Club career ==
On 29 June 2011 Assami signed a two-year contract with Algerian Ligue Professionnelle 1 club JS Kabylie. He returned to France in the summer 2012, joining GS Consolat.

== Coaching career ==
In the summer 2019, Assami became the manager of SC Air Bel's U16 team.

== Honours ==
- Won the Coupe Gambardella once with RC Strasbourg in 2006
