= Mustafa Miftah Bel'id al-Dersi =

Libyan politician

Mustafa Miftah Bel'id al-Dersi is a Libyan politician who served as Secretary of the General People's Committee of Libya for Youth and Sports.
