= Euro-Mediterranean free trade area =

Free trade area

The European Union-Mediterranean Free Trade Area (EU-MED FTA, EMFTA), also called the Euro-Mediterranean Free Trade Area or Euromed FTA, is based on the Barcelona Process and European Neighbourhood Policy (ENP). The Barcelona Process, developed after the Barcelona Conference in successive annual meetings, is a set of goals designed to lead to a free trade area in the Mediterranean Region and the Middle East.

A Regional Convention on pan-Euro-Mediterranean preferential Rules of Origin was signed in June 2011 to allow identical rules of origin across the region. The convention covers the EU, the EFTA, the EU customs unions with third states (Turkey, Andorra, San Marino), the EU candidate states, the partners of the Barcelona Process and possibly at a later stage all of the European Neighbourhood Policy partners. The convention was in force from May 2012 and is the last step taken in the Barcelona Process so far.

== History ==
The Agadir Agreement of 2004 (FTA between Jordan, Tunisia, Morocco, Egypt) was seen as its first building block. Further steps were envisioned into the European Neighbourhood policy (ENP) Action plans negotiated between the European Union and the partner states on the southern shores of the Mediterranean Sea, mostly with Arab League member states.

The initial aim was to create a matrix of Free Trade Agreements between each of the partners and the others. Then a single free trade area was to be formed, including the European Union.

== Partners ==
- European Union
- Turkey (maintains a Customs Union with the EU)
- Morocco (member of the Arab League and the Arab Maghreb Union)
- Algeria (member of the Arab League and the Arab Maghreb Union)
- Tunisia (member of the Arab League and the Arab Maghreb Union)
- Egypt (member of the Arab League)
- Jordan (member of the Arab League)
- Lebanon (member of the Arab League)
- Israel
- Palestinian National Authority (member of the Arab League)

== Prospective partners ==
- Syria (Member of the Arab League)
- Libya (member of the Arab League and the Arab Maghreb Union)
- Gulf Cooperation Council
- Iraq (Member of the Arab League)
- Mauritania (member of the Arab League and the Arab Maghreb Union)
- United Kingdom (Former member of the EU)

== FTA progress ==
	EU associated			Other Barcelona Conference partners									Prospective partners
	EU	EFTA	Turkey CU	Morocco	Algeria	Tunisia	Egypt	Jordan	Lebanon	Syria	Israel	PA	Libya	GCC	Mauritania	Iraq
EU		FTA 1973	CU 1996	AA 2000	AA 2005	AA 1998	AA 2004	AA 2002	AA 2006	AA	AA 2000	AA 1997		FTA
EFTA	FTA 1973		FTA 1992	FTA 1999		FTA 2005		FTA 2002	FTA 2005		FTA 1993	FTA 1999
Turkey CU	CU 1996	FTA 1992		FTA 2004		FTA 2005	FTA 2006	FTA 2009	FTA 2010	FTA 2004	FTA 1997	FTA 2005
Morocco	AA 2000	FTA 1999	FTA 2004		GAFTA 2005	GAFTA 2005	GAFTA 2005	GAFTA 2005	GAFTA 2005	GAFTA 2005		GAFTA 2005	GAFTA 2005	GAFTA 2005		GAFTA 2005
Algeria	AA 2005			GAFTA 2005		GAFTA 2005	GAFTA 2005	GAFTA 2005	GAFTA 2005	GAFTA 2005		GAFTA 2005	GAFTA 2005	GAFTA 2005		GAFTA 2005
Tunisia	AA 1998	FTA 2005	FTA 2005	GAFTA 2005	GAFTA 2005		GAFTA 2005	GAFTA 2005	GAFTA 2005	GAFTA 2005		GAFTA 2005	GAFTA 2005	GAFTA 2005		GAFTA 2005
Egypt	AA 2004		FTA 2006	GAFTA 2005	GAFTA 2005	GAFTA 2005		GAFTA 2005	GAFTA 2005	GAFTA 2005		GAFTA 2005	GAFTA 2005	GAFTA 2005		GAFTA 2005
Jordan	AA 2002	FTA 2002	FTA 2009	GAFTA 2005	GAFTA 2005	GAFTA 2005	GAFTA 2005		GAFTA 2005	GAFTA 2005		GAFTA 2005	GAFTA 2005	GAFTA 2005		GAFTA 2005
Lebanon	AA 2006	FTA 2005	FTA 2010	GAFTA 2005	GAFTA 2005	GAFTA 2005	GAFTA 2005	GAFTA 2005		GAFTA 2005		GAFTA 2005	GAFTA 2005	GAFTA 2005		FTA 2002, GAFTA 2005
Syria	AA		FTA 2004	GAFTA 2005	GAFTA 2005	GAFTA 2005	GAFTA 2005	GAFTA 2005	GAFTA 2005			GAFTA 2005	GAFTA 2005	GAFTA 2005		GAFTA 2005
Israel	AA 2000	FTA 1993	FTA 1997									CU 1994
PA	AA 1997	FTA 1999	FTA 2005	GAFTA 2005	GAFTA 2005	GAFTA 2005	GAFTA 2005	GAFTA 2005	GAFTA 2005	GAFTA 2005	CU 1994		GAFTA 2005	GAFTA 2005		GAFTA 2005
Libya				GAFTA 2005	GAFTA 2005	GAFTA 2005	GAFTA 2005	GAFTA 2005	GAFTA 2005	GAFTA 2005		GAFTA 2005		GAFTA 2005		GAFTA 2005
GCC	FTA			GAFTA 2005	GAFTA 2005	GAFTA 2005	GAFTA 2005	GAFTA 2005	GAFTA 2005	GAFTA 2005		GAFTA 2005	GAFTA 2005			GAFTA 2005
Mauritania
Iraq				GAFTA 2005	GAFTA 2005	GAFTA 2005	GAFTA 2005	GAFTA 2005	FTA 2002, GAFTA 2005	GAFTA 2005		GAFTA 2005	GAFTA 2005	GAFTA 2005

instrument and year of entry into force
instrument and year of provisional entry into force
in negotiations
no diplomatic relations with Israel

== See also ==
- African Economic Community
- Deep and Comprehensive Free Trade Area
- Eastern Partnership
- Economic integration
- EUR.1 movement certificate
- List of free trade agreements
- List of trade blocs
- Middle East economic integration
- Stability Pact for South Eastern Europe
- Union for the Mediterranean
- US-Middle East Free Trade Area (US-MEFTA)
