= Bangladesh National Scientific and Technical Documentation Centre =

Research institute in Bangladesh

- Formation: 1972
- Headquarters: Dhaka, Bangladesh
- Region served: Bangladesh
- Official language: Bengali
- Website: www.bansdoc.gov.bd

The Bangladesh National Scientific and Technical Documentation Centre is the national scientific research archive that supports research and development projects in Bangladesh. It is located in Dhaka, Bangladesh.

== History ==
The organization's origins trace back to a regional unit of the Pakistan National Scientific and Technical Documentation Centre within the East Regional Laboratories of the Pakistan Council of Scientific and Industrial Research. Following the Independence of Bangladesh, it was reestablished in 1972 as the Bangladesh National Scientific and Technical Documentation Centre and placed under the Bangladesh Council of Scientific and Industrial Research.
