= Okba Hezil =

Algerian footballer (born 1988)

Personal information
- Full name: Okba Hezil
- Date of birth: May 5, 1988 (age 38)
- Place of birth: Batna, Algeria
- Position: Defender

Youth career
- –2008: MSP Batna

Senior career*
Years	Team	Apps	(Gls)
2008–2011	MSP Batna	-	(-)
2011	JS Kabylie	6	(0)
- * Club domestic league appearances and goals as of 00:00, 7 November 2011 (UTC)

Okba Hezil (born May 5, 1988, in Batna) is an Algerian football player. He last played for JS Kabylie in the Algerian Ligue Professionnelle 1.

== Club career ==
Hezil began his career in the junior ranks of his hometown club of MSP Batna.

=== JS Kabylie ===
On June 25, 2011, Hezil signed a three-year contract with JS Kabylie. On July 16, 2011, he made his debut for the club as a starter in a 2011 CAF Confederation Cup group stage match against MAS Fez of Morocco.
