= Chaâbane Meftah =

Algerian footballer (born 1990)

Personal information
- Full name: Chaâbane Meftah
- Date of birth: March 3, 1990 (age 36)
- Place of birth: Tizi Ouzou, Algeria
- Position: Defender

Youth career
- –2011: JS Kabylie

Senior career*
Years	Team	Apps	(Gls)
2011–2012	JS Kabylie	4	(0)
- * Club domestic league appearances and goals as of 00:00, June 24, 2012 (UTC)

Chaâbane Meftah (born March 3, 1990) is an Algerian football player. He is currently unattached.

== Personal ==
Meftah was born in Tizi Ouzou. He comes from a long family of footballers, with three of his cousins having already played for JS Kabylie: Mahieddine Meftah, Mohamed Rabie Meftah and Rahim Meftah. Two of them, Mahieddine and Rabie, also played for the Algerian National Team. Another cousin, Jugurtha Meftah, is also a footballer and currently plays for JS Kabylie as well.

== Club career ==
On June 14, 2011, Meftah made his professional debut for JS Kabylie in a league match against WA Tlemcen.

In the summer of 2012, Meftah signed a two-year contract with WA Tlemcen. However, he was released before the start of the season.
