= Council of Arab Economic Unity =

International Arab Organization

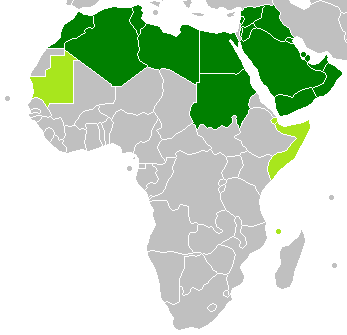
- Arab League and GAFTA member Arab League and candidate GAFTA member
- Administrative center: Cairo, Egypt
- Official language: Arabic
- Type: Trade bloc
- Membership: 18 members: Algeria; Bahrain; Egypt; Iraq; Jordan; Kuwait; Lebanon; Libya; Morocco; Oman; Palestine; Qatar; Saudi Arabia; Sudan; Syria; Tunisia; United Arab Emirates; Yemen; 4 candidates: Comoros; Djibouti; Mauritania; Somalia

Leaders
  - Secretary General: Mohammadi Ahmed Al-Ni
- Establishment: 3 June 1957
  - GAFTA signed: 1 January 1998
  - GAFTA in force: 1 January 2005
- GDP (PPP): 2019 estimate
  - Total: $7.649 trillion (4th)
- GDP (nominal): 2025 estimate
  - Total: $3.719 trillion (7th)

The Council of Arab Economic Unity (CAEU) (Arabic: مجلس الوحدة الاقتصادية العربية) was established by the Arab League on May 30, 1964, following an agreement drawn up in 1957 by the League's Economic Council.

== Objectives ==
According to The Economic Unity Agreement approved on June 3, 1957, the Council of Arab Economic Unity seeks to "organize and consolidate economic relations among the States of the Arab League on bases that are consistent with the natural and historical links among them; and to provide the best conditions for flourishing their economies, developing their resources and ensuring the prosperity of their countries." The bases of economic relations between states in the Council of Arab Economic Unity are outlined in Chapter 1, Articles 1 and 2 of The Economic Unity Agreement:

Article 1

Article 1 delineates each member state's rights to:

1. Personal and capital mobility
2. Free exchange of goods and products
3. Exercise of residence and economic endeavors (work, employment, etc.)
4. Transit and use of ports and airports
5. Possession and inheritance

Article 2

Article 2 behoves the signatories of The Economic Unity Agreement to work towards the objectives specified in Article 1 by:

1. Merging into a unified customs area
2. Unifying their import and export policies
3. Unifying their regulations with regard to transit
4. Jointly negotiating agreements with other states
5. Unifying and coordinating legislation to achieve equal conditions of agriculture, industry and trade among member states
6. Coordinating legislation with regard to labor and social security
7. (a) Coordinating "government and municipal taxes and duties and all taxes pertaining to agriculture, industry, trade, real estate, and capital investments" to achieve equivalent business climates among member states; (b) Avoiding double-taxing nationals of member states
8. Coordinating monetary and fiscal policies
9. Unifying "statistical methods of classification and tabulations"
10. Adopting any other measures consistent with the stated objectives of Articles 1 and 2

== Agadir Agreement ==
"The Agadir Agreement" for the establishment of a free trade zone between the Arab Mediterranean Nations was signed in Rabat, Morocco on 25 February 2004. The agreement aimed at establishing free trade between Jordan, Tunisia, Egypt and Morocco which was seen as a first potential step in the formation of the Euro-Mediterranean free trade area as envisaged in the Barcelona Process.

The Agreement aims to establish a Free Trade Area among the member states, in addition to increase intra-trade on one hand and with the European Union on the other. It also aims to enhance industrial integration among the Arab Mediterranean countries through the Implementation of the Pan-Euro-Mediterranean rules of origin and the utilization of the principle of cumulation of origin. This will enhance the member states’ export capacity towards the EU market and boost attraction for more foreign and European direct investment.

In 2016, the membership of Palestine and Lebanon was approved at the third meeting of Agadir member ministers.

== Greater Arab Free Trade Area ==
The Greater Arab Free Trade Area (GAFTA) is a pan-Arab free trade zone that came into existence on 19 February 1997. It was founded by 14 countries: Bahrain, Egypt, Iraq, Kuwait, Lebanon, Libya, Morocco, Oman, Qatar, Saudi Arabia, Sudan, Syria, Tunisia, and the United Arab Emirates. The formation of GAFTA followed the adoption of the "Agreement to Facilitate and Develop Trade Among Arab Countries" (1981) by the Arab League's Economic and Social Council (ESC) and the approval by seventeen Arab League member-states at a summit in Amman, Jordan of the "Greater Arab Free Trade Area Agreement" (1997). In 2009, Algeria joined GAFTA as the eighteenth member-state. GAFTA is supervised and run by the ESC.

The members participate in 96% of the total internal Arab trade, and 95% with the rest of the world by applying the following conditions:

1. Instruct the inter-customs fees:
  To reduce the customs on Arab products by 10% annually, the 14 Arab states reported their custom tariff programs to the Security Council of the Arab League to coordinate them. Syria was excepted and uses the Brussels tariffs system.
2. Applying the locality of the Arab products:
  All members have shared their standards and specifications to help their products move smoothly from one country to another.
  The League has also created a project to apply the Arab Agriculture Pact:
  Which is to share the standards of the agricultural sector and inject several restrictions and specifications.
  The Arab League granted exceptions, which allowed for a customs rate for certain goods to six members for several goods, however requests for additional exceptions were rejected by Morocco, Lebanon and Jordan.
3. Private sectors:
  The League created a database and a service to inform and promote the private sector's benefits.
4. Communication:
  The Economic and Social Council in its sixty-fifth meeting agreed on pointing a base for communication to ease communication between member states, and to work on easing interaction between the private and public sectors to further apply the Greater Arab Free Trade Area.
5. Customs Duties:
  In the sixty-seventh meeting the Economic and Social Council agreed that a 40% decrease on customs on goods in the past 4 years of the GAFTA would continue and following the decisions at the Amman summit, the members will make efforts to eliminate all customs duties on local goods.

== See also ==
- African Economic Community
- Intergovernmental Authority on Development
- Arab Fund for Economic and Social Development
- Arab Federation for Digital Economy
- Middle East Free Trade Area (disambiguation)
- Arab Monetary Fund
- Arab Maghreb Union
- Euro-Mediterranean free trade area
- Euro-Mediterranean Partnership
- European Neighbourhood Policy
- Third country economic relationships with the European Union
- Rules of Origin
- Market access
- Free-trade area
- Tariffs
