= Jugurtha Meftah =

Algerian footballer (born 1990)

Personal information
- Full name: Jugurtha Meftah
- Date of birth: July 28, 1990 (age 36)
- Place of birth: Tizi Ouzou, Algeria
- Position: Defender

Team information
- Current team: JS Kabylie

Youth career
- –2011: JS Kabylie

Senior career*
Years	Team	Apps	(Gls)
2011–	JS Kabylie	2	(0)
- * Club domestic league appearances and goals as of 00:00, 9 July 2011 (UTC)

Jugurtha Meftah (born July 28, 1990) is an Algerian football player. He currently plays for JS Kabylie in the Algerian Ligue Professionnelle 1.

== Personal ==
Meftah was born on July 28, 1990, in Tizi Ouzou. He comes from a long family of footballers, with three of his cousins having already played for JS Kabylie: Mahieddine Meftah, Mohamed Rabie Meftah and Rahim Meftah. Two of them, Mahieddine and Rabie, also played for the Algerian National Team. Another cousin, Chaâbane Meftah, is also a footballer and currently plays for JS Kabylie as well.

== Club career ==
On May 24, 2011, Meftah made his professional debut for JS Kabylie in a league match against ASO Chlef as a 49th-minute substitute for Ibrahim Amada.
