= Economy of the Arab League =

The economy of the Arab League is the economy of the member states of the Arab League. The economy has traditionally been dependent on exports of oil and natural gas; however, the tourism sector has grown rapidly, becoming the fastest-growing sector in the region. The Greater Arab Free Trade Area, founded in 1997, is the league's free trade area which removed customs taxes on 65% of trade between countries in the Arab World.

Members of the Arab League are among the richest and poorest of the world, and there is a great disparity in the economic development of members of the league. There is a significant difference imbalance in wealth between the Gulf states, which include Qatar, the United Arab Emirates, Saudi Arabia and war-torn nations within the league, such as: Syria, Iraq and Yemen.

== GDP and GDP per capita of member states ==
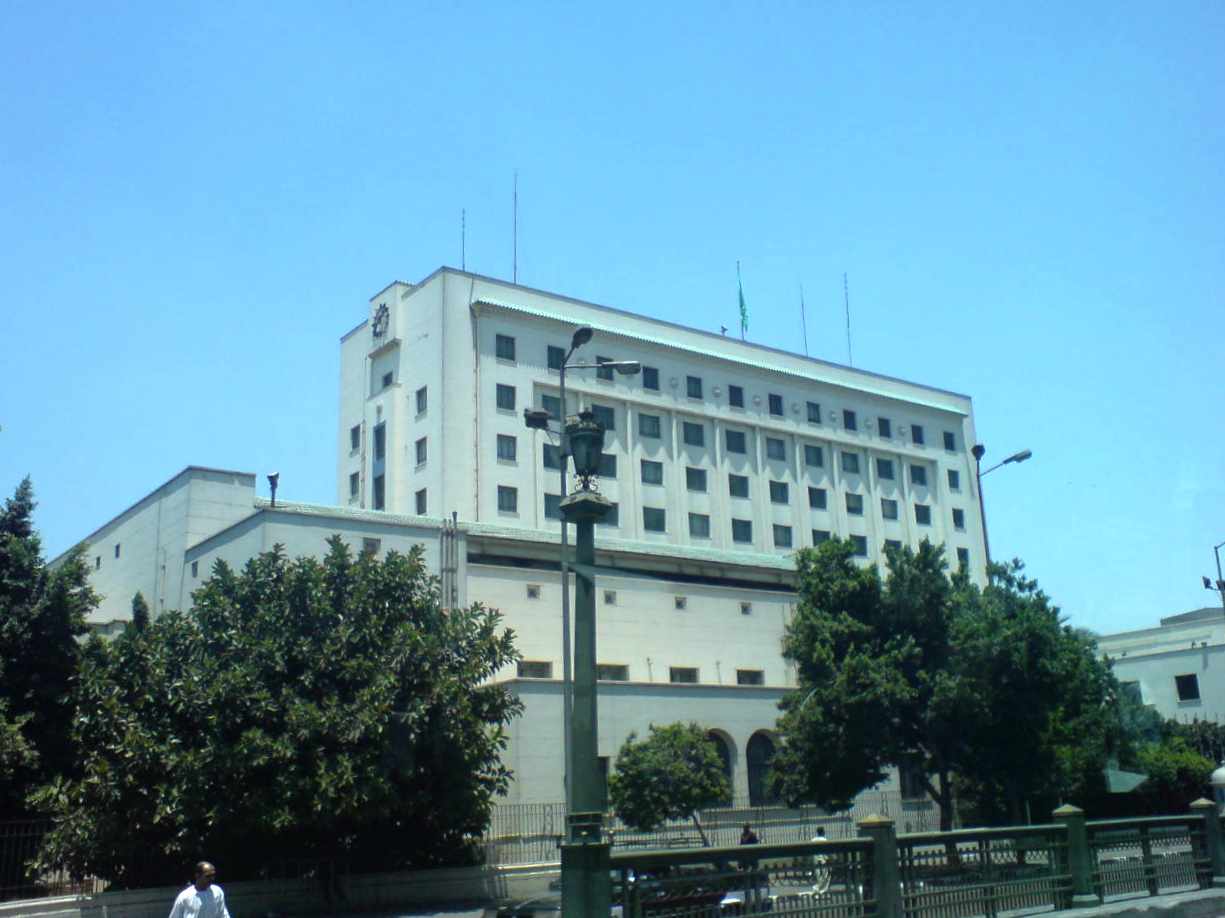
Arab League HQ building in Cairo; Doha; & Jeddah; Egypt; Saudi Arabia, & United Arab Emirates

Arab League members by GDP (PPP) per capita in 2023: >$70,000 $60,000 - $70,000 $50,000 – $60,000 $40,000 – $50,000 / $30,000 – $40,000 $20,000 – $30,000 $10,000 – $20,000 $5,000 – $10,000 / $2,500 – $5,000 $1,000 – $2,500 <$1,000 No data

Based on latest figures and estimates, the Arab League has a GDP of approximately US$4.148 trillion at nominal values and Int$10.528 trillion at purchasing power parity (PPP). The member state with the largest nominal GDP is Saudi Arabia at US$1.389 trillion, followed by the UAE at US$622 billion and Egypt at US$430 billion. The member state with the highest GDP (PPP) is Saudi Arabia at Int$2.895 trillion, followed by Egypt at Int$2.567 trillion and the UAE at Int$1.006 trillion.

The member state with the smallest nominal GDP is Comoros at US$1.814 billion.

The member state with the highest nominal GDP per capita is Qatar at US$68,138, followed by the UAE at US$54,214 and Saudi Arabia at US$37,811. The member states with the highest GDP (PPP) per capita is Qatar at Int$112,312, followed by the UAE at Int$87,774 and Saudi Arabia at Int$78,815. The member state with the lowest nominal GDP per capita is Yemen at US$451.

== List ==
Latest available GDP data for members of the Arab League in $US
Country/Territory	GDP (nominal, Billions)	GDP (PPP, Billions)	GDP per capita (nominal)	GDP per capita (PPP)	Year
World	126,295.331	222,759.639	14,217	25,591	2026
Arab League	4,428.370 (Note: The sum of all GDP figures below.)	10,527.618 (Note: The sum of all GDP figures below.)	8,911	22,613	2026
Saudi Arabia	1,388.676	2,894.592	37,811	78,815	2026
United Arab Emirates	621.546	1,006.293	54,214	87,774	2026
Egypt	429.645	2,566.688	3,904	23,321	2026
Algeria	317.173	941.544	6,628	19,677	2026
Iraq	264.784	670.507	5,677	14,376	2026
Qatar	217.416	358.364	68,138	112,312	2026
Morocco	194.333	469.394	5,107	12,336	2026
Kuwait	172.920	283.133	33,164	54,303	2026
Oman	117.176	247.390	21,645	45,698	2026
Jordan	64.909	153.646	5,601	13,257	2026
Tunisia	60.745	196.564	4,893	15,833	2026
Syria	60.043	136.379	2,807	6,375	2010
Libya	52.453	141.260	6,962	18,749	2026
Bahrain	48.849	115.915	29,569	70,165	2026
Sudan	44.688	126.791	864	1,956	2026
Lebanon	34.497	70.189	6,443	13,110	2025
Palestine	16.017	25.233	2,853	4,495	2024
Mauritania	14.352	43.912	3,033	9,280	2026
Somalia	14.174	34.108	895	1,956	2026
Yemen	10.435	30.926	384	1,596	2026
Djibouti	4.725	10.865	4,421	10,166	2026
Comoros	1.814	3.925	1,951	4,223	2026
