= Export credit agency =

Intermediary between governments and exporters

An export credit agency (known in trade finance as an ECA) or investment insurance agency is a private or quasi-governmental institution that acts as an intermediary between national governments and exporters to issue export insurance solutions and guarantees for financing. The financing can take the form of credits (financial support) or credit insurance and guarantees (pure cover) or both, depending on the mandate the ECA has been given by its government. ECAs can also offer credit or cover on their own account. This does not differ from normal banking activities. Some agencies are government-sponsored, others private, and others a combination of the two.

ECAs currently finance or underwrite about US$430 billion of business activity abroad – about US$55 billion of which goes towards project finance in developing countries – and provide US$14 billion of insurance for new foreign direct investment, dwarfing all other official sources combined (such as the World Bank and Regional Development Banks, bilateral and multilateral aid, etc.). As a result of the claims against developing countries that have resulted from ECA transactions, ECAs hold over 25% of these developing countries' US$2.2 trillion debt.

Export credit agencies use three methods to provide funds to an importing entity:

- Direct Lending: This is the simplest structure whereby the loan is conditioned upon the purchase of goods or services from businesses in the organizing country.
- Financial Intermediary Loans: Here, the export–import bank lends funds to a financial intermediary, such as a commercial bank, that in turn loans the funds to the importing entity.
- Interest Rate Equalization: Under an interest rate equalization, a commercial lender provides a loan to the importing entity at below market interest rates, and in turn receives compensation from the export–import bank for the difference between the below-market rate and the commercial rate.

== Officially supported export credits ==
Credits may be short term (up to two years), medium term (two to five years) or long term (five to ten years). They are usually supplier's credits, extended to the exporter, but they may be buyer's credits, extended to the importer. The risk on these credits, as well as on guarantees and insurance, is borne by the sponsoring government. ECAs limit this risk by being "closed" on risky countries, meaning that they do not accept any risk on these countries. In addition, a committee of government and ECA officials will review large and otherwise riskier than normal transactions.

== Tied aid credits ==
Officially supported export credit may be connected to official development assistance (ODA) in two ways. First, they may be mixed with ODA, while still financing the same project (mixed credit). As the export credit is tied to purchases in the issuing country, the whole package qualifies as a tied aid credit, even if the ODA part is untied aid. Second, tied aid credits are not very different from export credits, except in interest, grace period (the time when there is no repayment of the principal) and terms of repayment. Such credits are separated from export credit by an OECD requirement that they have a minimum degree of "softness". "Softness" is measured by a formula that compares the present value of the credit with the present value of the same amount at standardized "commercial" terms. This difference is expressed as a percentage of the credit and called "concessionality level". Thus a grant has a concessionality level of 100%, a commercial credit scores zero per cent. The higher the concessionality level, the more the tied aid credit looks like ODA, the lower, the more it looks like an export credit.

Partially untied credits consist of a tied and an untied part. The latter is usually intended to finance "local cost", investment cost to be made in the importing country. This part may also be in a local currency. Partially untied aid is treated as tied aid.

== International regulation ==
Both officially supported export credits and tied aid credit and grants are extended on terms bound by the OECD's arrangement on official export credits. The Arrangement is a "Gentlemen's Agreement" amongst its Participants who represent most OECD Member Governments. The Arrangement sets forth the most generous export credit terms and conditions that may be supported by its Participants. The main purpose of Arrangement is to provide a framework for the orderly use of officially supported export credits. In practice, this means providing for a level playing field (whereby competition is based on the price and quality of the exported goods and not the financial terms provided) and working to eliminate subsidies and trade distortions related to officially supported export credits.

Since 1999, country risk categories have been harmonized by the Arrangement and minimum premium rates have been allocated to the various risk categories. This is intended to ensure that competition takes place via pricing and the quality of the goods exported, and not in terms of how much support a state provides for its exporters. The Arrangement does not extend to exports of agricultural commodities or military equipment. A recent decision at the World Trade Organization (WTO) indicates that the use of officially supported export credits in agriculture is bound by WTO members' commitments with respect to subsidised agricultural exports (see the WTO Appellate Body decision on the Brazil-US cotton case as it relates to the General Sales Manager (GSM) 102 and 103 programs and other US agricultural export credits, summarized here).

At the EU level, the European Commission, in particular the Directorate General for Trade, plays a role in the harmonization of Export Credit Agencies and the co-ordination of policy statements and negotiation positions. This is based on council decisions 73/391/EEC and 76/641/EEC. These decisions provide for prior consultations among member states on long term export credits. Member states may ask each other if they are considering to finance a specific transaction with official export credit support. EU members may not subsidize intra-EU export credits. The application of the OECD arrangement in providing export credit is mandatory in EU countries under Art. 1 of Regulation (EU) No. 1233/2011.

The Berne Union, or officially, the International Union of Credit & Investment Insurers, is an international organisation for the export credit and investment insurance industry. The Berne Union and Prague Club combined have more than 70 member companies spanning the globe. Its membership includes both commercial and state-sponsored insurers.

== Support and criticism ==
Some observers view state-sponsored export credits as nothing more than export subsidies by a different name. As such, the activities of ECAs are considered by some to be a type of corporate welfare. Others argue that ECAs create debt in poor countries motivated not by development goals but to support rich countries' industry.

In addition, ECAs may soak up aid money as debt relief programs predominantly relieve poor countries from debt owed to donor countries' ECAs. ECAs are also criticised for insuring companies against political actions that aim to protect workers' rights, other human rights, or the natural environment in the countries in which the investment is being made.

Advocates of ECAs assert that export credits allow impoverished importers to purchase needed goods that would otherwise be unaffordable; export credits are components of a broader strategy of trade policies; and government involvement can achieve results that the private sector cannot, such as applying greater pressure on a recalcitrant borrower.

These arguments for and against export credits are not new and have been studied at length in academic literature. For a good general discussion, see Baron, David P. The Export-Import Bank: An Economic Analysis. Academic Press. 1983.; or Eaton, Jonathan. "Credit Policy and International Competition." Strategic Trade Policy and the New International Economics, ed. Paul Krugman. MIT Press, Cambridge Mass. 1988.

== List of export credit agencies ==
=== Export credit agencies ===
- Africa – African Export-Import Bank (Afreximbank)
- Asia – Asian Development Bank
- Islamic Corporation for the Insurance of Investment and Export Credit ("ICIEC") (part of the Islamic Development Bank)
- Islamic Development Bank (IsDB)
- Latin America – Inter-American Development Bank ("IADB")
- Latin America – Development Bank of Latin America and the Caribbean ("CAF")
- Nordic Development Fund ("NDF")
- OPEC Fund for International Development ("OFfID")
- Multilateral financial institutions
  - African Trade Insurance Agency ("ATI")
  - Central and Eastern Europe – European Union (EU)
  - Central and Eastern Europe – European Investment Bank ("EIB")
  - Multilateral Investment Guarantee Agency ("MIGA') (part of World Bank)
  - International Finance Corporation ("IFC") (part of World Bank)
- Sub-regional banks
  - Australia – Australian Agency for International Development (AusAID)
  - Austria – Austrian Development Agency (ADA)
  - Canada – Canadian International Development Agency (CIDA)
  - Denmark – Danish Development Agency (DANIDA)
  - Finland – Department for International Development Cooperation
  - France – Agence française de développement (AFD)
  - Germany – Kreditanstalt für Wiederaufbau (KFW)
  - Japan – Japan International Cooperation Agency (JICA)
  - Netherlands – Netherlands Development Cooperation
  - New Zealand – New Zealand Official Development Assistance (NZODA)
  - Norway – Norwegian Agency for Development Cooperation
  - Russia – Foreign Insurance Agency of Russia
  - Sweden – Swedish International Development Cooperation Agency (SIDA)
  - United Kingdom – Department for International Development (DFID)
  - United States – U.S. Agency for International Development (USAID)

=== Official export credit agencies by country ===
- Algeria – Compagnie Algérienne Assurance et de Garantie des Exportations, (CAGEX)
- Australia – Export Finance and Insurance Corporation (EFIC)
- Austria – Oesterreichische Kontrollbank (OeKB)
- Bangladesh – Export Import Bank of Bangladesh Limited
- Belgium – Office national du Ducroire/Nationale Delcrederedienst (ONDD)
- Brazil – Brazilian Guarantees Agency (ABGF), Brazilian Development Bank (BNDES)
- Canada – Export Development Canada (EDC)
- China – Export-Import Bank of China (Exim), China Export & Credit Insurance Corporation (Sinosure), China Development Bank (CDB), People's Insurance Company of China (PICC)
  - Hong Kong – Hong Kong Export Credit Insurance Corporation
- Colombia – Banco de Comercio Exterior de Colombia (Bancóldex)
- Czech Republic – Export Guarantee and Insurance Corporation (EGAP), Czech Export Bank
- Denmark – Export and Investment Fund of Denmark (EIFO)
- Egypt – Export Credit Guarantee Company of Egypt, (ECGE)
- Estonia – Kredex Krediidikindlustus (EST)
- Finland – Finnvera and its subsidiary Finnish Export Credit Ltd (FEC)
- France – BPIfrance Assurance Export (BPI FAE), Direction des Relations Economiques Extérieures (Ministère de l'Economie) (DREE)
- Germany – Euler Hermes Kreditversicherungs-AG, AuslandsGeschäftsAbsicherung der Bundesrepublik Deutschland
- Greece – Export Credit Insurance Organisation (ECIO)
- Hungary – Hungarian Export Credit Insurance Ltd (MEHIB), Hungarian Export-Import Bank
- India – Export-Import Bank of India, ECGC Limited
- Iran -Export Guarantee Fund of Iran,(EGFI)
- Israel – Israel Foreign Trade Risks Insurance Corporation, (ASHRA)
- Italy – SACE S.p.A. Servizi Assicurativi del Commercio Estero
- Japan- Japan Bank for International Cooperation (JBIC), Nippon Export and Investment Insurance (NEXI)
- Jordan – Jordan Loan Guarantee Cooperation (JLGC), Loan Guarantee & Export Credit Guarantee
- Kazakhstan - Export Insurance Company Export Credit Agency of Kazakhstan, JSC
- Luxembourg – Office du Ducroire (ODD)
- Mexico – Banco Nacional de Comercio Exterior (Bancomext)
- Morocco – Société Marocaine d'Assurance à l'Exportation
- Netherlands – Atradius
- New Zealand – Export Credit Office (ECO)
- Nigeria – Nigerian Export-Import Bank
- Norway – The Norwegian Guarantee Institute for Export Credits (GIEK), Export Credit Norway
- Pakistan – The EXIM Bank of Pakistan
- Philippines - Philippine Guarantee Corporation
- Poland – Korporacja Ubezpieczeń Kredytów Eksportowych (KUKE)
- Portugal – Companhia de Seguro de Créditos
- Russia – Export Insurance Agency of Russia
- Saudi Arabia – Saudi Export Program, (SEP)
- South Africa – Export-Import Credit Insurance Agency (EICIA)
- South Korea – Korea Trade Insurance Corporation (K-SURE), The Export-Import Bank of Korea (KEXIM)
- Slovakia – Export-Import Bank of the Slovak Republic (Eximbank SR)
- Sri Lanka – Sri Lanka Export Credit Insurance Corporation (SLECIC)
- Spain – Compañía Española de Seguros de Crédito a la Exportación CESCE (Ministerio de Economía)
- Sweden – Exportkreditnämnden (EKN)
- Switzerland – Swiss Export Risk Insurance (SERV)
- Taiwan – Export–Import Bank of the Republic of China
- Turkey – Export Credit Bank of Turkey (Türk Eximbank)
- Ukraine – Export Credits Agency (ECA)
- United Arab Emirates – Etihad Credit Insurance (ECI) Etihad Credit Insurance (ECI)
- United Kingdom – United Kingdom Export Finance (UKEF)
- United States – Export-Import Bank of the United States (Ex-Im Bank), CoBank

== See also ==
- Trade credit insurance
