= International Credit Insurance & Surety Association =

International trade association for the private credit insurance industry

- Abbreviation: ICISA
- Formation: 1928; 98 years ago
- Type: Trade association
- Location: Amsterdam, Netherlands
- Services: Industry information and analysis
- Fields: Trade insurance, surety, reinsurance
- Members: 58
- Executive Director: Richard Wulff
- Website: icisa.org
- Formerly called: ICIA

The International Credit Insurance & Surety Association (ICISA) is an international trade association for companies that provide private trade credit insurance, reinsurance and surety bonds. The organization has a coordinating role on the world market for private trade credit guarantees, a role that was critical in the post-war expansion of international trade. Its secretariat continues to publish reports and organize events that provide information and analysis about the state of the credit insurance industry and its role in the global economy.

== History ==
Eight companies founded the International Credit Insurance Association (ICIA) in 1928, as a result of the first international conference on trade and credit insurance, held in London in 1926. Five of the founding members (Cobac of Belgium, Hermes of Germany, SFAC of France, SIAC of Italy and Trade Indemnity of the United Kingdom) were all eventually absorbed into Allianz Trade. The other three founding members are Crédito y Caución from Spain; Eidgenössische (now Winterthur) from Switzerland and Nederlandsche Credietverzekering Maatschappij (NCM, now Atradius) from the Netherlands.

After World War II, international trade increased rapidly and trade finance became an important tool for export promotion. International coordination of the market for trade credit guarantees was a felt need. ICIA fulfilled this role for private credit insurance providers and its membership increased steadily. In the 1950s, the association opened to companies providing surety bonds and changed its name to ICISA. In 2000, it started to include companies providing reinsurance.

== Organization ==
The ICISA Secretariat is headquartered in Amsterdam. The association acts as a platform for exchange among members, promotes collaboration between insurance companies and external stakeholders from finance industry, such as regulators and policy makers, banks, academia and other related associations. ICISA is member of the Digital Standards Initiative led by the International Chamber of Commerce and the Expert Group on Enhanced Coordination of External Financial Tools of the European Commission.

== Publications ==
The ICISA secretariat publishes books and reports that provide statistics and analysis of the credit insurance industry and its role in the global economy. For some publications, ICISA collaborates with the Berne Union, a sister organization for Export Credit Agencies.

- ICISA (2007), Catalogue of Trade Credit Terminology
- ICISA (2015), A Guide to Trade Credit Insurance. Anthem Press

== Membership ==
By 2024, the organization had 58 members. In 2023, together they provided risk protection amounting to 16.3 billion euros.

Current members
Company	Trade credit insurance	Surety bonds	Reinsurance
Active Re			Green checkmark
Afianzadora Latinoamericana		Green checkmark	
AIG	Green checkmark		
Allianz Trade	Green checkmark	Green checkmark	Green checkmark
Antares Re			Green checkmark
Arch Re Europe			Green checkmark
Aserta		Green checkmark	
Atradius	Green checkmark	Green checkmark	
Aviva		Green checkmark	
Axa Switzerland	Green checkmark	Green checkmark	
Axa XL			Green checkmark
Axis Capital	Green checkmark		Green checkmark
Azuaga Seguros		Green checkmark	
BTG Pactual			Green checkmark
CCR Re			Green checkmark
Cesce	Green checkmark	Green checkmark	
China National Investment & Guarantee Corporation		Green checkmark	
Chubb Limited		Green checkmark	
CLAL	Green checkmark		
Coface	Green checkmark	Green checkmark	
Credendo	Green checkmark	Green checkmark	
CGIC	Green checkmark	Green checkmark	
Devk Re/Echo Re			Green checkmark
Exim Thailand	Green checkmark		
Fianzas y Cauciones Atlas		Green checkmark	
Green Stars BNP Paribas	Green checkmark		
Groupama	Green checkmark	Green checkmark	
Hannover Re			Green checkmark
ICIC	Green checkmark	Green checkmark	
Insurety	Green checkmark	Green checkmark	Green checkmark
Intact Insurance	Green checkmark	Green checkmark	
Interamerican		Green checkmark	
KazakhExport	Green checkmark		
Liberty Mutual	Green checkmark	Green checkmark	Green checkmark
Mitsui Sumitomo	Green checkmark	Green checkmark	
MS Reinsurance			Green checkmark
Munich Re		Green checkmark	Green checkmark
Navigators Re			Green checkmark
Partner Re			Green checkmark
Peak Re			Green checkmark
PICC	Green checkmark	Green checkmark	
Ping An	Green checkmark		
QBE	Green checkmark	Green checkmark	
R+V Re			Green checkmark
Renaissance Re			Green checkmark
S2C		Green checkmark	
Sace BT	Green checkmark	Green checkmark	
SCOR			Green checkmark
Seoul Guarantee Insurance	Green checkmark	Green checkmark	
Sofimex	Green checkmark	Green checkmark	
Sompo	Green checkmark	Green checkmark	
Sompo Re			Green checkmark
Swiss Re			Green checkmark
Swiss Re Corporate Solutions	Green checkmark	Green checkmark	
Tokyo Marine	Green checkmark	Green checkmark	
Travelers		Green checkmark	
Tryg Trade	Green checkmark	Green checkmark	
Zurich Insurance Group	Green checkmark	Green checkmark	
