= African Trade and Investment Development Insurance =

African insurance, trade and political risk mitigation institution

Coordinates: 01°17′47.5″S 36°48′50.5″E

ATIDI (African Trade & Investment Development Insurance)
- Formation: 2001; 25 years ago
- Type: Treaty
- Purpose: Mitigation of political (investment) and commercial risks in Africa
- Headquarters: Kenya Re Towers, 5th Floor, Upper Hill, Nairobi, Kenya
- Region served: Africa
- Products: (Investment Risk Insurance); Political Risk Insurance; Trade Credit Insurance; Performance Bonds
- Members: 24 African Countries; 1 Non-African Country; 12 Institutional Investors
- Official language: English & French
- Key people: Chief Executive Officer: Manuel Moses; Chief Underwriting Officer: Benjamin Mugisha; Chief Financial Officer: Gladys Karuri; General Counsel & Corporate Secretary: Linda Bwakira; Chief Risk Officer: Anthony Ehimare
- Website: https://www.atidi.africa/

The African Trade & Investment Development Insurance (ATIDI) is an investment, trade and political risk-mitigation institution on the African continent intended to provide insurance against political (investment) and commercial risks in order to attract foreign direct investment to the region. ATIDI was founded in 2001 by seven COMESA countries, with technical and financial backing of The World Bank.

ATIDI is Africa's only multilateral investment and credit insurer and as of 31 December 2023 it had supported trade and investments into Africa valued at over USD85 billion since inception. ATIDI facilitates partnerships between African countries, lenders, investors, traders and insurers by providing Political (Investment) Risk Insurance to lenders and investors and also (Trade) Credit Insurance and Surety Bonds to commercial bank lenders and private sector traders of goods and services.

== History ==
ATIDI was created in 2001 as African Trade Insurance Agency (ATI), to help drive much needed investment insurance capacity to Africa in order to support higher levels of foreign direct investments. Seven COMESA countries obtained a grant from the World Bank to conduct a study to look at factors contributing the low levels of FDI to their countries. The study revealed political risk to be the main constraint and the primary concern for prospective investors. The study expanded into a World Bank project (The Regional Trade Facilitation Project I) from which ATI was created. ATI was launched in 2001 in Kampala, Uganda and opened its doors in Nairobi, Kenya, ATIDI's headquarters.

== Shareholders / Members ==
ATIDI has 24 African member states 1 non African Member State and 12 other corporate shareholders including the African Development Bank, Trade Development Bank, UK Export Finance (UKEF), SACE, CESCE, Africa RE, Kenya RE, Chubb Nippon Export and Investment Insurance (NEXI) and Atradius. Membership is open to all African Union member states, non-African states, private corporations, regional and international institutions.

India became the first non-African member country to become a shareholder through its government-backed export credit agency, ECGC

Country/Entity	Paid-up Capital (in million USD)	Non-African Member Countries	Paid-up Capital (in million USD)	Other Shareholders	Paid-up Capital (in million USD)
Angola	15.8				
Benin	27.6	India (ECGC)	10.6	African Development Bank	15.0
Burkina Faso	10.8				
Burundi	16.2				
Cameroon	9.0				
African Reinsurance Corporation	1.0				
Atradius	0.1				
Chad	10.7				
Côte d'Ivoire	20.5				
Chubb Limited	9.0				
Democratic Republic of Congo	21.0				
COMESA	0.1				
Ethiopia	22.9				
CESCE	1.0				
Ghana	15.8				
Kenya Reinsurance Corporation	1.0				
Kenya	30.1				
NEXI	10.0				
Madagascar	7.3				
SACE SpA	10.0				
Malawi	18.7				
Mali	7.8				
Niger	9.5				
Nigeria	12.6				
Rwanda	9.2				
Trade Development Bank	1.0				
Zep Re	3.6				
Senegal	11.8				
South Sudan	9.6				
Tanzania	17.8				
Togo	25.1				
Uganda	24.1				
UK Export Finance	0.1				
Zambia	18.2				
Zimbabwe	13.9				

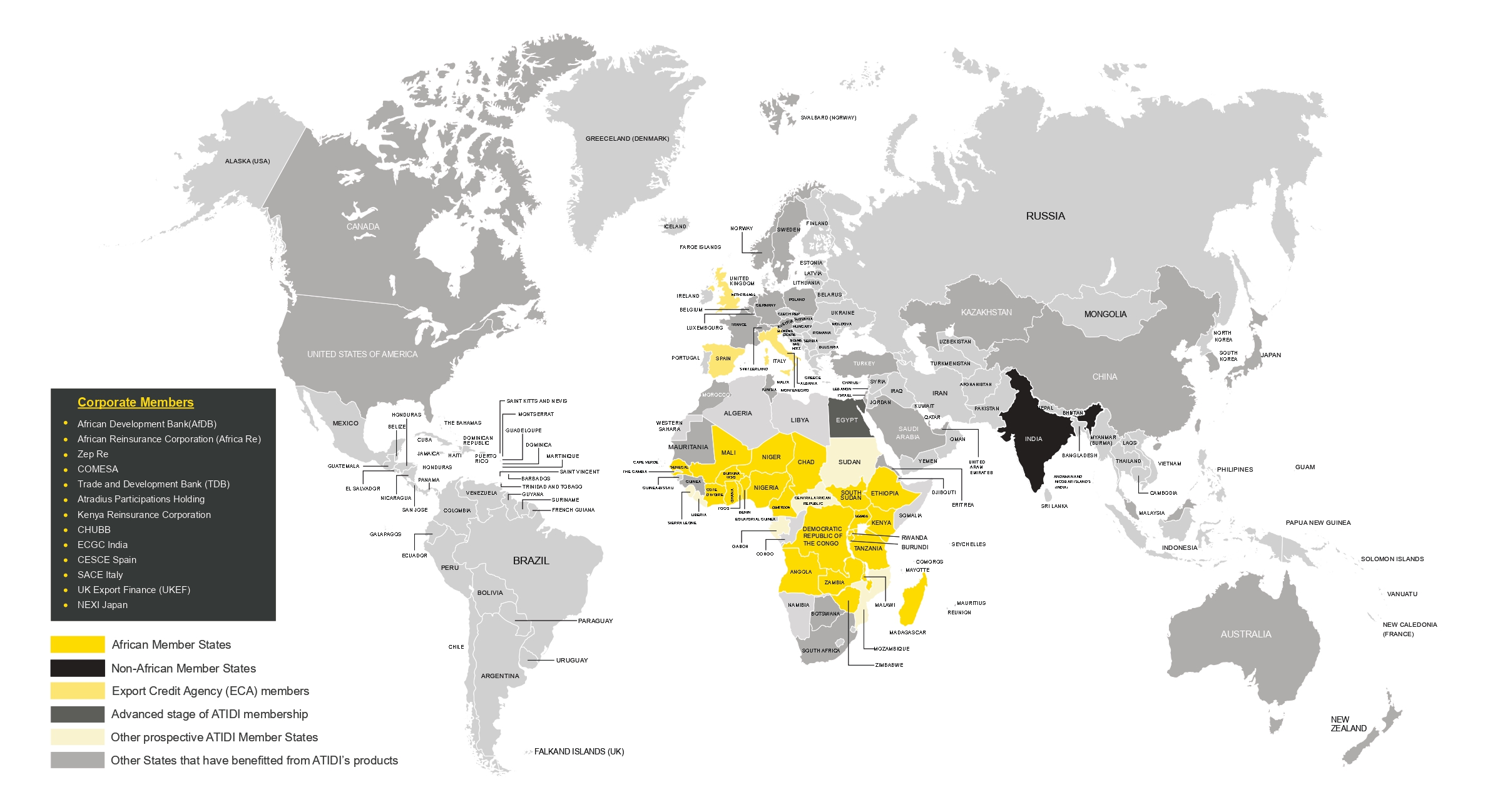
ATI's Global Membership & Business Reach

== Credit ratings ==
- S&P: Reaffirmed A/Stable (April 2024)
- Moody's: Assigned A3/Positive (March 2023)

== See also ==
- African Development Bank
- African Export-Import Bank
- Africa Finance Corporation
- Berne Union
- Chubb Limited
- COMESA
- ECGC
- MIGA
- Mizuho Corporate Bank
- MUFG
- Nippon Export & Investment Insurance (NEXI)
- Sumitomo Mitsui Banking Corporation
- The World Bank
- Trade Development Bank
