= General Insurance Association of Korea =

Trade association in South Korea

- Hangul: 손해보험협회
- Hanja: 損害保險協會
- RR: Sonhae boheom hyeophoe
- MR: Sonhae pohŏm hyŏphoe

The General Insurance Association of Korea (GIAK; Korean: 손해보험협회; formerly Korea Non-Life Insurance Association) is a non-profit trade association representing the general (non-life) insurance industry of South Korea. Its main purpose is to foster sound development of the general insurance industry and to uphold the rights and interests of its members as well as the insurance policyholders. Its headquarters is located in Jongno District, Seoul, South Korea.

== History ==
The GIAK was established in 1946 as "Chosun Non-Life Insurance Association". In 1948, it was officially incorporated as "Korean Non-Life Insurance Association". In 2007, its name was changed to that of today.

== Goals and activities ==
The GIAK's stated goals for service to the public include:

- Improve systems concerning general insurance
- Participate in insurance-related international bodies
- Disclose the business performances of the member companies
- Promote traffic safety campaigns
- Management of insurance solicitors

The organization also operates services for consumer protection and advocacy, including an insurance consumer counseling center. The counseling center enlists insurance experts and attorneys to provide advice and handle consumer complaints. The center provides these services online, via a telephone call center, in person at their offices and through a mobile counseling center.

Another goal is to decrease insurance fraud by educating involved governmental and healthcare industry bodies. One example of their pursuit of this goal was the Gwangju Regional Insurance Crimes Citizens' Joint Workshop, which was a conference focused on decreasing the high rate of health insurance crimes in Gwangju. As part of this conference, the organization presented awards to police and healthcare workers who actively prevented insurance fraud, including one Gwangju police officer who arrested 164 people involved in fraud.

The GIAK also works alongside government agencies to facilitate communication with insurance companies during disaster events. For example, in the 2018 typhoon season, the organization provided assistance to the Ministry of Public Safety and Security by facilitating communication with vehicle insurance companies. If a parking area were flooded, the ministry or local governments could report vehicle numbers to the GIAK, who would manage communication with insurance companies. In some cases, vehicles in parking areas with a high flood risk could be moved to safer locations.

== Member Companies ==
- Meritz Fire & Marine Insurance
- Hanwha General Insurance
- Lotte Insurance
- MG Non-Life Insurance
- Heungkuk Fire & Marine Insurance
- Samsung Fire & Marine Insurance
- Hyundai Marine & Fire Insurance
- KB Insurance
- DB Insurance
- Korean Reinsurance Company (Korean Re)
- Seoul Guarantee Insurance
- Axa General Insurance
- AIG Korea
- The-K Non-Life Insurance
- Nonghyup Property & Casualty Insurance
- BNP Paribas Cardif General Insurance
- ACE American Insurance Company
