= Sinosure =

Chinese state-owned export insurer

China Export & Credit Insurance Corporation
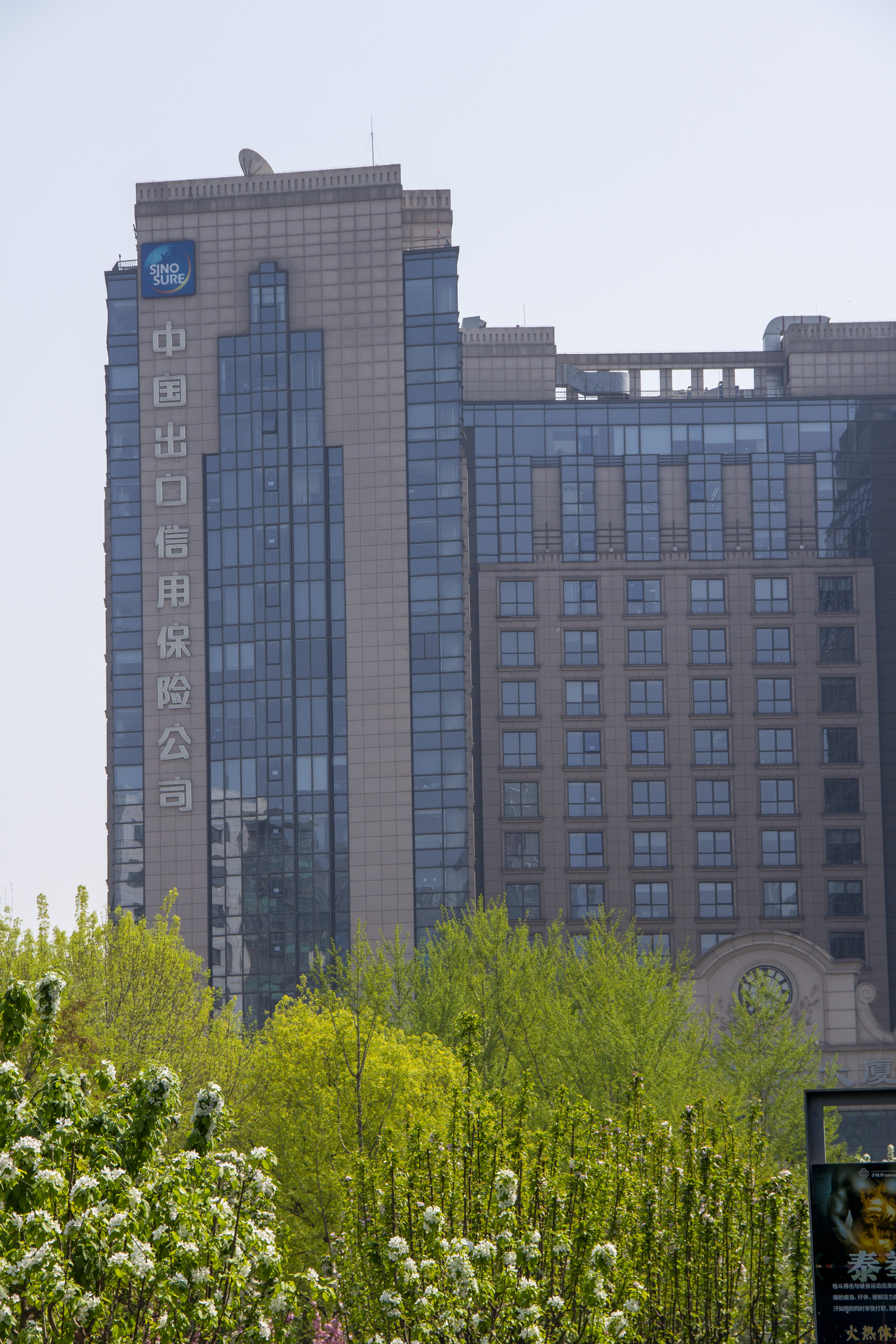
- Trade name: Sinosure
- Native name: 中国出口信用保险公司 (中国信保)
- Company type: State-owned enterprises
- Founded: 2001
- Headquarters: Beijing, People's Republic of China
- Key people: Wang Yi, Chairman
- Products: Export credit insurance
- Website: www.sinosure.com.cn

China Export & Credit Insurance Corporation
- Traditional Chinese: 中國出口信用保險公司
- Simplified Chinese: 中国出口信用保险公司
Transcriptions
Standard Mandarin
- Hanyu Pinyin: Zhōngguó Chūkǒu Xìnyòng Bǎoxiǎn Gōngsī

Sinosure
- Traditional Chinese: 中國信保
- Simplified Chinese: 中国信保
Transcriptions
Standard Mandarin
- Hanyu Pinyin: Zhōngguó Xìnbǎo

China Export & Credit Insurance Corporation (simplified Chinese: 中国出口信用保险公司; traditional Chinese: 中國出口信用保險公司; pinyin: Zhōngguó Chūkǒu Xìnyòng Bǎoxiǎn Gōngsī), commonly known as Sinosure (中国信保; 中國信保; Zhōngguó Xìnbǎo), is a major Chinese state owned enterprise (SOE) under the administration of Ministry of Finance of the People's Republic of China serving as the provider of export credit insurance, in particular coverage for the export of high-value added goods in China.

== History ==
Sinosure was established in December 2001 by merging the Export Credit Insurance Department of the People's Insurance Company of China (PICC) and the export credit insurance section of the China Export and Import Bank. Following China's entry into the World Trade Organization, Sinosure was mandated to support Chinese companies' export and overseas business. Financing since 2001 has totaled 290 billion dollars' worth of exports and investments, and 570 billion yuan of lending.

In 2009, the company insured 116 billion dollars' worth of exports.

In May 2011, the Chinese government decided to inject 3.1 billion dollars into Sinosure, as part of its effort to improve the commercial viability of financial institutions.

Sinosure was hit hard by a classical example of political risk in 2011, when the uprising in Libya meant it must pay insurance claims of more than 1 billion dollars by 13 SOEs which had large ongoing investments in the country.

Sinosure is a member of the Berne Union.

== Products ==
Sinosure is China's policy-oriented insurance company and is a state arm as opposed to a commercial insurer. Firms borrowing from Chinese banks may purchase insurance from Sinosure.

Sinosure offers coverage against political risks, commercial and credit risks. This includes short-, medium- and long-term export credit insurance, investment insurance, bond and guarantee business, debt and capital retrieval business and credit assessment business. Investment guarantees cover political risks such as currency and remittance restrictions, expropriation and nationalization, sovereign breaches of contract and war.

Sinosure also provides support for export financing. In March 2011, it reached an agreement with J.P. Morgan to provide a wide array of financial services to exporters, with Sinosure covering J.P. Morgan's exposure.

Sinosure also covers SMEs (since 2005, even those with export volumes of under 2 million dollars a year) that are unable to bear the political and commercial risks of international trade. The company also provides coverage for foreign investment by Chinese companies, this time most often by large SOEs.

As of at least 2019, Sinosure covers hundreds of billions in trade yearly, approximately 80% of which is short-term export credit insurance.

== See also ==
- Dai Chunning, former executive investigated for corruption
- Policy banks
