= Hermes cover =

A Hermes cover (Hermesdeckung in German) is an export credit guarantee (ECG) by the German Federal Government.

These guarantees are an important part of German foreign trade policy and protect German companies in the event of non-payment by foreign debtors.

== Economic importance ==
The system of Hermes covers was originally introduced in 1949 for cases where firms could find no private insurance and has become a pillar of Germany's export industry. Today, Hermes guarantees enable exporters to cover themselves against economic risks (customer risks) and political risks (country risks). The federal guarantee is necessary because it is not possible to obtain adequate cover from private insurers, particularly against political risks for exports to non-OECD countries.

In 2005, the German state made guarantees for orders totaling EUR 19.77 billion (US$25 billion), which is about 2.5 percent of total German exports. About 90% of the cover was accounted for by exports to developing countries and states in central and eastern Europe, including CIS countries. These guarantees only result in expenditure by the state if the customer does not pay.

The purpose of Hermes cover, from the point of view of the German state, is the promotion of exports and helping to provide German jobs.

A study commissioned by the German Ministry of Economics and Technologies carried out by Prognos concluded that the net effect of Hermes guarantees on employment is in the order of 140,000 to 210,000 jobs, mainly in the mechanical engineering, electrical engineering, and chemical sectors, most Hermes guarantees being for small and medium-sized enterprises (SME).

== Management of the scheme ==
The management of the guarantees is in the hands of Euler Hermes (which is the lead) and PricewaterhouseCoopers. Decisions on matters of principle and the underwriting of large export transactions are made by an inter-ministerial committee comprising representatives not only of the German Federal Ministry of Economics and Technology but also of the Federal Ministry of Finance, the German Foreign Office and the Federal Ministry for Economic Cooperation and Development.

== Cost ==
The charges for these export credit guarantees include an application fee, a policy-issuing fee, a risk-dependent commission, a duration-dependent commission, and an additional charge. The costs depend on the type, size, and duration of the transaction and on the risk assessment for the importing country. In the case of a claim, there is an excess paid by the exporter, generally between 5 and 15 percent.

== Types of risk ==
Risks covered include political risks, such as bad debt losses due to legislative or administrative measures, war, and civil commotion, losses due to the inability to convert or transfer sums paid in local currency by the debtor due to restrictions in the international payment system, inability to fulfill the contract due to political circumstances, and loss of goods (before the risk has passed to the foreign buyer) due to political circumstances, such as the goods being confiscated or destroyed. They also include commercial risks such as protracted default and bankruptcy of the buyer.

== Criticism ==
Hermes cover can be granted when the export transactions are worthy of support and the risks appear tolerable. The worthiness can result from job security, structural considerations or foreign policy objectives. In recent years, state export credit agencies (ECAs), including Hermes have been subject to public scrutiny, because they backed projects that some disapproved of, for instance because of environmental concerns.

== Environmental aspects ==
The environment is an important issue when approving Hermes guarantees. When appraising the application, the environmental effects of projects are an important criterion, both in terms of their worthiness and the tolerability of the risk. As stated by the ECA, it is the aim of the German government not to support any projects that have serious negative ecological, social, or developmental consequences. Since January 1, 2004, the OECD "Recommendation on Common Approaches on Environment and Officially Supported Export Credits" have been applied. The procedure laid down there reflects international developments regarding the appraisal of environmental aspects by export credit agencies. The "Common Approaches" are a set as international obligatory rules for the environment and export credit guarantees, so they cannot take account of all national peculiarities; for this reason, the German national environmental guidelines of 26 April 2001 are applied in some areas.
