= Compagnie Française d'Assurance pour le Commerce Extérieur =

France-based credit insurer

Coface
- Type: Société anonyme
- Traded as: Euronext: COFA; CAC Mid 60
- Industry: Credit Insurance
- Founded: 1946
- Headquarters: Bois-Colombes, France
- Area served: Worldwide
- Key people: Bernardo Sanchez Incera (chairman of the board of directors)
- Products: credit insurance, factoring, debt collection, business information, bonding
- Revenue: 1 451 M€ (2020)
- Net income: 82,9 M€ (2020)
- Total equity: 1806 M€ (2018)
- Owner: Arch Capital Group (29.5%), floating (70.5%)
- Number of employees: 4,450
- Website: coface.com

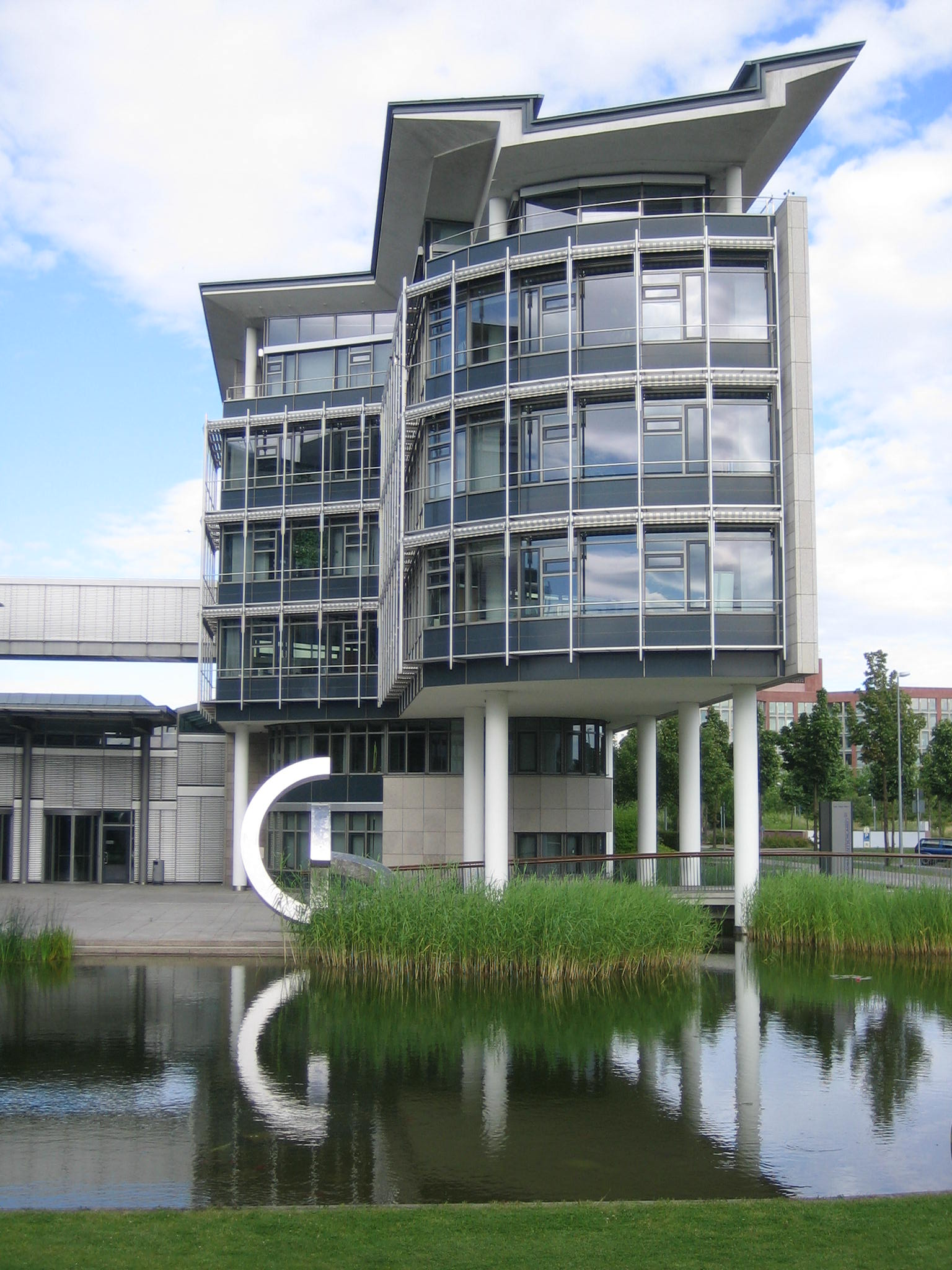
COFACE building in Mainz, Germany

Compagnie Française d'Assurance pour le Commerce Extérieur (Coface) is a credit insurer that operates worldwide' in addition to offering debt collection services, factoring and business information, and bonds.

Created in 1946, Coface was listed on the Euronext Paris Stock Exchange in 2014. Coface employs 4,100 staff in 66 countries. Each quarter, Coface publishes its assessments of country risk for 160 countries, based on its knowledge of companies' payment behavior and on the expertise of its underwriters.

== History ==
Coface was founded in 1946 as the French specialist export credit insurance company.

During the 1990s, Coface developed internationally through internal and external growth, by acquiring credit insurance companies and by creating new subsidiaries or branches. External acquisitions included La Viscontea in 1992 (Italian safety and credit insurance company), London Bridge Finance in 1993 (UK financial company providing credit insurance services), Allgemeine Kredit in 1996 (German company providing domestic and export credit insurance options) and Osterreichische Kreditversicherung in 1997 (Austrian credit insurer) along with the acquisition of the Continental portfolio in the US in 2002. The Group's international development also involved the creation of the Coface Partner network in 1992, which enabled it to conclude partnerships with general insurance groups and banks, notably in emerging markets.

In 2002, Natexis acquired Coface.

In 2010, Coface began offering credit insurance policies in Russia.

In 2014, Coface was listed on the Paris stock exchange (Euronext Paris, CAC Small.

In 2016, Coface transferred the state guarantees’s activities to the public bank Bpifrance thus putting an end to Coface's activities for the French State.

In 2018, Coface announced the acquisition of PKZ, market leader in credit insurance in Slovenia, and a subsidiary of SID Bank16.

On February 25, 2020, Natixis announced that it had signed a partnership agreement with Arch Capital Group relating to the sale of 29.5% of Coface's capital for €480 million. On the same day, Coface announced its new Build to Lead strategic plan which aims by 2023 to strengthen risk management and improve the group's commercial and operational efficiency.

In July 2020, Coface finalized the acquisition of GIEK Kredittforsikring AS with the aim of strengthening its market position in Northern Europe.

In 2021, the Group is present directly or indirectly in 100 countries.

== Critics ==
As of 2022, Coface has continued its operations in Russia, maintaining its business activities and relationships despite the Russian invasion of Ukraine. The company has faced criticism for not making any public changes to its operations in Russia amid growing international calls for businesses to withdraw from the country.

== Activities ==
=== Credit insurance ===
When a company does a major business deal with a client, it risks insolvency or even bankruptcy if the client fails to pay within the agreed timeframe. Credit insurance helps companies avoid that risk.

The credit insurer assesses the financial health of companies' clients, based on a real-time analysis of country, sector and credit risks, and provides information that enables transactions to be carried out more securely. The credit insurer alerts companies of any changes in the financial situation of their clients.

=== Debt collection ===
A service offered by Coface in some countries. If a risk is established, it collects debts in their name and guarantees the payment of trade receivables. In providing that guarantee, credit insurance also enables improved credit and loan conditions from banks.

=== Business information ===
To prevent the risk of non-payment, it is important to collect relevant information on buyers and their environment. An analysis of this information serves as a basis for decision-making. Coface offers various information services, ranging from the provision of raw data to a risk-taking recommendation on any company in the world. Multiple levels of information are collected and analyzed: information reports, synthetic indicators of single and global risk, and various risk-taking recommendation tools.

=== Factoring ===
Factoring allows companies to grant extended payment deadlines to their clients. The company issues its invoice as usual. Coface then provides it with virtually the entire amount of the invoice until the client's payment is received.

=== Bonding ===
When submitting a bid for an RFP, importing/exporting, or conducting certain types of transactions, companies sometimes need guarantees. Coface offers four types of bonds: market guarantees, regulated profession guarantees, environmental guarantees, and customs/excise duty guarantees.

=== Economic research ===
Coface's Economic Research department analyzes country and sector risks and corporate insolvencies worldwide. Their studies are published on the Coface websites, with their forecasts on international or business risks. Each year, Coface publishes its Country & Sector Risk Handbook, providing an economic outlook for 162 countries and 13 global sectors.

Coface's Economic Research departement is made up of 12 economists based in 6 regions of the world. 230 credit analysts specialized by business sector complete the organization.

== Country risk assessments ==
Coface's country risk analysis enables companies to assess the risk of a business defaulting in a given country, and to evaluate the overall quality of the business environment in the country to which it wishes to export goods or services.

Coface assigns a rating to each of the 162 countries it monitors. This rating reflects the average risk of short-term non-payment for companies in this country. Eight ranks are used:

- A1: very low risk
- A2: low risk
- A3: quite acceptable risk
- A4: acceptable risk
- B: significant risk
- C: high risk
- D: very high risk
- E: extreme risk

Coface publishes its country risks assessments on a quarterly basis."Country risk assessment map - January 2017 - 4th quarter 2016 / Publications / News and Publications - Coface". www.coface.com. 2023.

== Head Office ==
Coface's head office is located in Bois-Colombes in the western suburbs of Paris, close to the business center La Défense.

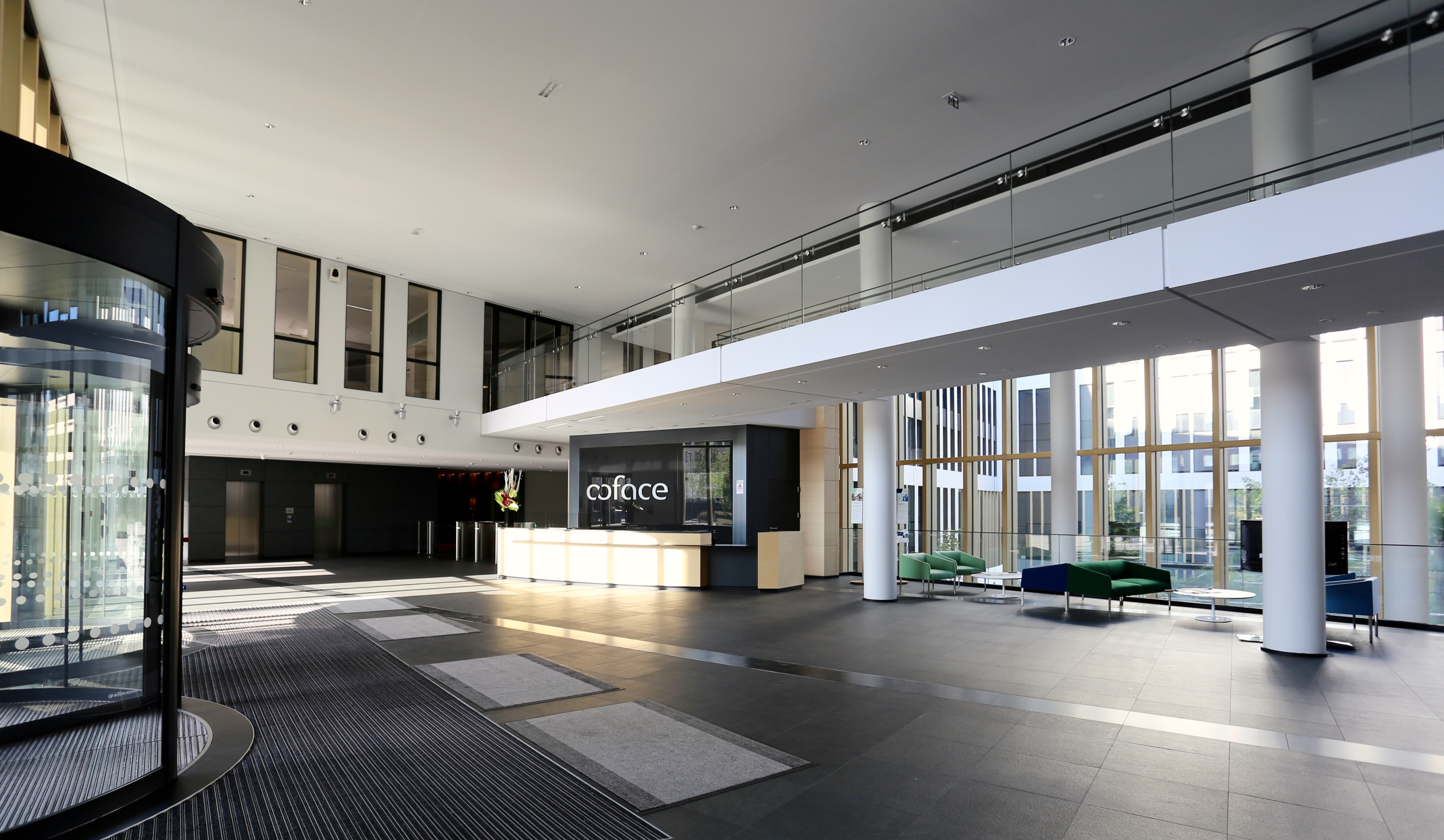
Coface's head office

== Equivalent in the world ==
- Germany: Euler Hermes
- Netherlands: Atradius
- United States: Export-Import Bank of the United States
- United Kingdom: UK Export Finance
- Italy: Servizi Assicurativi del Commercio Estero
- South Korea: Korea Trade Insurance Corporation
