= NEXI =

NEXI or Nexi may refer to:

- Nexi, an Italian bank
- Nippon Export and Investment Insurance, an incorporated administrative agency of the Japanese government that provides trade and investment insurance services
- Nexi (robot), a mobile humanoid robot created by the Massachusetts Institute of Technology
