= International Strategic Analysis =

- Founded: 2003
- Founder: Michael Weidokal
- Headquarters: Luxembourg
- Services: country intelligence, economic forecasting, international market analysis
- Website: www.isa-world.com

ISA (International Strategic Analysis (ISA) is an international research and consulting firm that provides country intelligence, economic forecasting, and international market analysis to companies, financial institutions, government bodies, and universities.

Headquartered in Luxembourg in 2003 by American economist Michael Weidokal, who is executive director. ISA has clients in more than 150 countries.

== Publications ==
ISA Country Reports: ISA publishes 120 individual ISA Country Reports that provide coverage and analysis of the political, economic, demographic, and environmental issues and trends in each country.

ISA Region Reports: ISA publishes eight individual ISA Region Reports that contain graphs, charts, and detailed descriptions of each region's economic data, trade and investment statistics, recent elections and other related topics.

ISA Economic Forecasts: ISA publishes Economic Forecasts for nearly 180 countries, including historical economic data back to 1993 and forecast data that goes forward five years.

ISA Risk Forecasts: ISA publishes Risk Forecasts for nearly 180 countries, covering domestic and international political risk, domestic and international economic risk, demographic and social risk, and environmental and natural disaster risk.

The ISA Global Update: The ISA Global Update is ISA's weekly electronic newsletter covering the key political, economic and business issues and events of the past week as well as an outlook for the week ahead in global business, economics, and politics.

The Global Economic and Risk Outlook: ISA publishes the annual ISA Global Economic and Risk Outlook that previews the global economy for the coming year.

== Predictions ==
In the spring of 2018, ISA cited that geopolitical risk levels were rising in many areas of the world as the United States, increasingly turned inwards, leaving rivals such as China and Russia with an opportunity to expand their influence in regions such as Southeast Asia, the Pacific, Central Asia and Eastern Europe. ISA also forecast that the threat of a major Middle East war involving Saudi Arabia, Iran and other regional powers was a rising threat to global stability as the proxy wars between these powers in Syria and Yemen continued.

On the economic front, ISA warned that, while global economic growth rates were forecast to remain relatively high over the near term, longer-term economic risk levels were rising. Among the major risks facing the global economy were the threat of a global share price correction, the withdrawal of stimulus programs in Europe, rising debt levels in China, the threat of a global trade war and the impact of low commodity prices on many emerging markets.
