= Ethiopia and the World Bank =

Monetary relationship of Ethiopia and World Bank

The relationship between Ethiopia and the World Bank was formalized on December 27, 1945.

Ethiopia's first projects approved by the World Bank supported the building of infrastructure such as roads and highways during the 1950s. Ethiopia first sought a loan for "Highway Project (01)", which was approved on September 13, 1950. This loan had a total commitment value of $5 million. The goal of the project was to repair, rebuild, and construct new roads in Ethiopia after the Italian occupation from 1935 to 1941.

Ethiopia joined the International Finance Corporation (IFC) on July 20, 1956 and the International Development Association (IDA) on April 11, 1961.

Ethiopia joined the Multilateral Investment Guarantee Agency (MIGA) on August 13, 1991. However, Ethiopia did not join the International Centre for Settlement of Investment Disputes (ICSID).

As Ethiopia is one of the poorest countries in Africa, in 2005 Ethiopia received a 100% loan debt relief from the World Bank, International Monetary Fund, and the African Development Bank.

The World Bank will contribute $300 million in May 2022 to help Ethiopia's conflict-affected regions recover and be rebuilt.

== Voting powers in the World Bank Group ==
International Bank for Reconstruction and Development (IBRD)

- Total Subscriptions - Amount 147.0 / Percent of Total 0.06
- Voting Power - No. of Votes 2,201 / Percent of Total 0.09

International Finance Corporation (IFC)

- Total Subscriptions - Amount 127 / Percent of Total 0.00
- Voting Power - No. of Votes 942 / Percent of Total 0.03

International Development Association (IDA) Part II Countries

- Voting Power - No. of Votes 49,232 / Percent of Total 0.17

Multilateral Investment Guarantee Agency (MIGA) Part II Countries

- Total Subscriptions - Amount 1.23 / Percent of Total 0.07
- Voting Power - No. of Votes 349 / Percent of Total 0.16

== Projects ==
Ethiopia has received approval for large projects, including:

- One WASH - Consolidated water Supply, Sanitation, and Hygiene Account Project (One WASH - CWA)
- Ethiopia Climate Action Through Landscape Management Program For Results
- Renewable Energy Guarantees program
- Lowlands Livelihood Resilience Project
- Ethiopia Growth and Competitiveness
