= Etihad Credit Insurance =

United Arab Emirates public bank

- الاتحاد لائتمان الصادرات

Agency overview
- Formed: 1 February 2018; 8 years ago
- Jurisdiction: United Arab Emirates
- Headquarters: Etihad Towers, Abu Dhabi
- Agency executives: Abdulla bin Touq Al Marri, Chairman; Thani bin Ahmed Al Zeyoudi, Deputy Chairman
- Website: eci.gov.ae

Etihad Credit Insurance (ECI) (Arabic: الاتحاد لائتمان الصادرات) is the official export credit agency of the United Arab Emirates. The agency "aims to support the economic diversification by guaranteeing commercial and non-commercial risks associated with export and re-export of goods and services".

The ECI's main objective is supporting the diversification of the UAE's economy by supporting non-oil export and imports. By 2020 major industries supported included the chemical industry, steel, construction, cables, food, packaging, electronics, healthcare and printing

== History ==
Founded in February 2018, the ECI is a public joint stock company wholly owned by the UAE federal government and the governments of the emirates of Abu Dhabi, Dubai, Ajman, Ras Al Khaimah, and Fujairah.

In 2021, ECI was voted as a permanent member of the Berne Union.

In 2021, according to the ECI's annual report, the company extended non-oil support of $3.1 billion, to 92 counties, covering 18 sectors. Top destinations for UAE exports included Saudi Arabia, Iraq, India, Oman, Kuwait, and Jordan.

== Offices ==
THE ECI's main office is in the UAE capital of Abu Dhabi, and operates a second office in Dubai.

== See also ==
- List of export credit agencies
