= Bancomext =

State-owned bank in Mexico, established in 1937

Banco Nacional de Comercio Exterior, S.N.C.
- Type: State owned
- Industry: Financial services
- Founded: 22 April 1937; 89 years ago (as Banco Mexicano para el Comercio Exterior, S.A.)
- Headquarters: Mexico City, Mexico
- Key people: Roberto Lazzeri Montaño (General Director)
- Products: Banking, Financial
- Website: www.bancomext.com

The Banco Nacional de Comercio Exterior (English: National Exterior Commerce Bank) or "Bancomext" is a Mexican state-owned bank and export credit agency established in 1937 to promote foreign trade and support the export activities of Mexican companies.
