= Finnvera =

Finnish state-owned financing company

Finnish: Finnvera Oyj

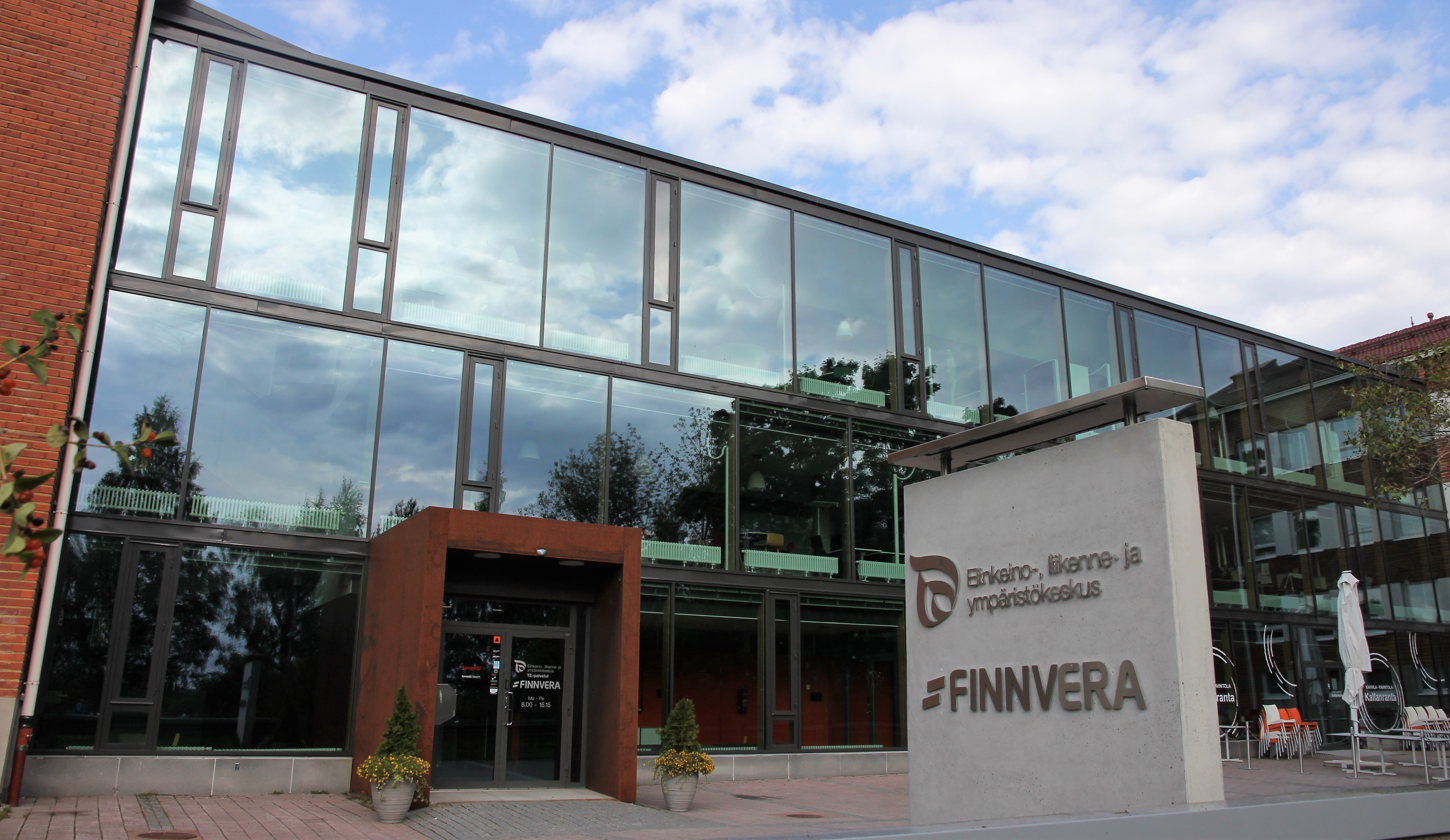
- Company type: Government-owned corporation
- Founded: 1999
- Headquarters: Kuopio, Finland
- Key people: Pauli Heikkilä, CEO
- Number of employees: 370
- Website: www.finnvera.fi

Finnvera is a Finnish state-owned financing company. It is the official export credit agency for Finland. Finnvera provides loans, credits and guarantees. In 2013, Finnvera financed around 3500 start-up enterprises. The company is responsible to the Finnish Ministry of Employment and the Economy.

== History ==
Finnvera was founded in 1999 through a merger of Kera Plc and the Finnish Guarantee Board.

The European Commission has given Finnvera the right to support Finnish exports.

During the first half of 2011, Finnvera provided over two billion euros in export and guarantees.

In September 2014, Finnvera issued a 500 million euro bond under their Euro Medium Term Note programme.

== See also ==
- Business Finland
- SITRA
