= EXIAR =

Russian government agency

EXIAR Russia's External Foreign Insurance Agency
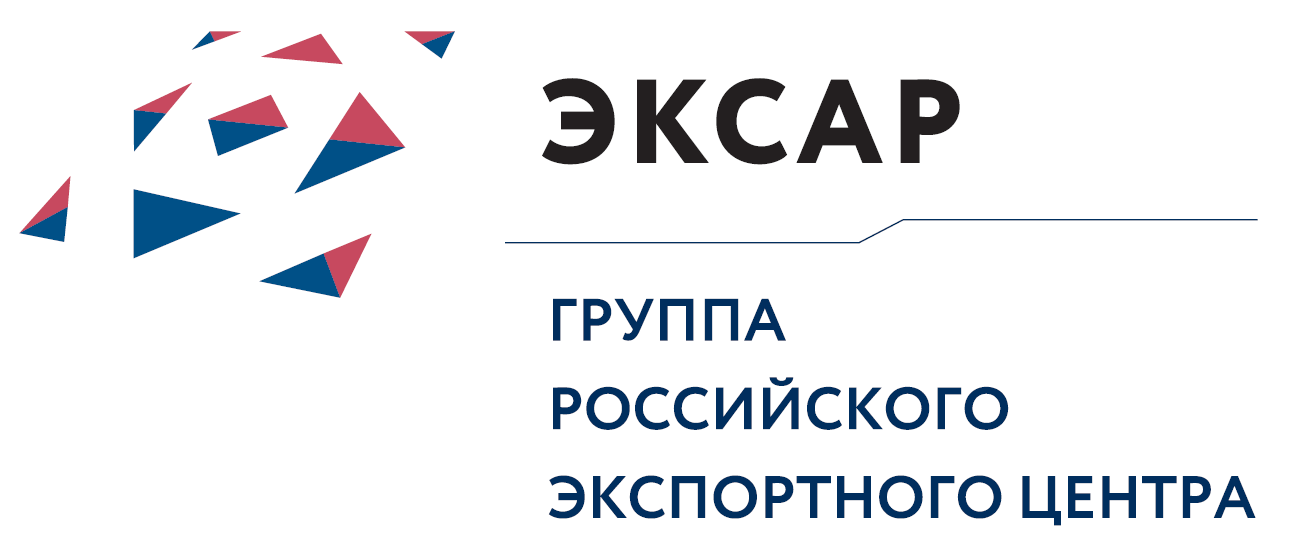

Agency overview
- Preceding agency: Export-Import Insurance Company (REISO)
- Headquarters: Moscow, Russia
- Minister responsible: Maksim Oreshkin, Minister of Economic Development
- Agency executive: Peter Fradkov, Director-General
- Website: www.exiar.ru

Export Insurance Agency of Russia (EXIAR) (Russian: Российское Агентство по страхованию экспортных кредитов и инвестиций, ЭКСАР; Officially: Russian Agency for Insurance Export credits and Investments) is a Russian government agency, which was established on October 13, 2011 as the successor for the Russian Export-Import Insurance Company (Российское экспортно-импортное страховое общество), that had existed since April 23, 1996.

Among its missions are in supporting the Russian export aboard, through insurance of export credits against commercial and political risks, as well as Russian investments abroad against political risks.

The sole shareholder of the company is Vnesheconombank (Foreign Economic Bank).

The Agency’s charter capital makes RUR 30 billion (ca USD 1 billion). In line with the international practices EXIAR is aimed at developing financial instruments for export state support providing insurance for export credits against commercial and political risks and covering political risks related to Russian investments abroad.

Core activities of EXIAR are insurance of short-, mid- (up to 2 years) and long-term (up to 20 years) export and financial credits against commercial and political risks, as well as insurance of Russian investments abroad against political risks.

== Missions ==
- Enhancement and support for Russian technology and equipment export
- Insurance support for Russian exporters entering new and risky markets
- Progressive implementation and adaptation of the best international practices and standards in export credit insurance in the Russian system of financial export support
- Enhanced access to financing
- Increased exports to new markets
- Support for private banks in financing Russian exporters

== See also ==
- Export credit agency
- Export-Import Bank of the United States
- Rossotrudnichestvo
- US AID
