= Dai Chunning =

Chinese business executive

Dai Chunning 戴春宁
- Born: February 1962 (age 64); Ningxia, China
- Occupations: Banking and insurance executive
- Years active: 1981–2013
- Political party: Chinese Communist Party (expelled)

Dai Chunning (simplified Chinese: 戴春宁; traditional Chinese: 戴春寧; pinyin: Daì Chūnníng; born February 1962) is a former Chinese business executive. He served as the deputy general manager of the China Export & Credit Insurance Corporation (also known as Sinosure) from 2012 to 2013.

Dai began his career as a bank loans administrator in Wuzhong, Ningxia. He then made his way up the ranks of the Industrial and Commercial Bank of China in Ningxia, then was transferred to work in Beijing under the national risk management division. He then worked in the loans administration and general operations departments of the Exim Bank of China. In March 2010 he was promoted to lead the general services division of the bank. Beginning in August 2011 he served as the chief assistant to the bank's president. In April 2012 he began working for Sinosure as a vice-president. As he was a senior executive at a state-owned corporation, he also held the rank of a department-prefecture level official on China's civil service hierarchy.

On December 1, 2013, Dai was detained for investigation for "severe violations of discipline and law" by the Central Commission for Discipline Inspection, the Communist Party's anti-graft agency. The investigation concluded in June 2014 that Dai "embezzled massive amounts of public funds with his associates, took massive bribes personally or in association with others, abused his position of power for his personal interests and those of related companies" and that he "committed adultery." He was then expelled from the Chinese Communist Party. On October 21, 2014, Dai was indicted by prosecution organs in Hebei province and arrested to face charges of bribery and embezzlement.
