= Multilateral Investment Guarantee Agency =

International financial institution

- MIGA logo
- Formation: 12 April 1988
- Type: Development finance institution
- Legal status: Treaty
- Purpose: Political risk insurance, foreign direct investment
- Headquarters: 12th floor, 1800 G Street NW, Washington, D.C., U.S.
- Members: 182 countries
- Managing Director: Tsutomu Yamamoto
- Parent organization: World Bank Group
- Website: MIGA.org

The Multilateral Investment Guarantee Agency (MIGA) is an international financial institution which offers political risk insurance and credit enhancement guarantees. These guarantees help investors protect foreign direct investments against political and non-commercial risks in developing countries. MIGA is a member of the World Bank Group and is headquartered in Washington, D.C. in the United States.

MIGA was established in 1988 as an investment insurance facility to encourage confident investment in developing countries. MIGA is owned and governed by its member states, but has its own executive leadership and staff which carry out its daily operations. Its shareholders are member governments that provide paid-in capital and have the right to vote on its matters. It insures long-term debt and equity investments as well as other assets and contracts with long-term periods. The agency is assessed by the World Bank's Independent Evaluation Group each year.

== History ==
In September 1985, the Board of Governors of the World Bank endorsed the Convention establishing the Multilateral Investment Guarantee Agency. MIGA was established and became operational on 12 April 1988 under the leadership of then-Executive Vice President Yoshio Terasawa, becoming the fifth member institution of the World Bank Group. MIGA initially had $1 billion ($1.94 billion in 2012 dollars) in capital and 29 member states.

All members of the International Bank for Reconstruction and Development (IBRD) were eligible to become members of the agency. MIGA was established as an effort to complement existing sources of non-commercial risk insurance for investments in developing countries. By serving as a multilateral guarantor, the agency reduces the likelihood of confrontations among the investor's country and the host country.

MIGA's inaugural investment guarantees were issued in 1990 to cover $1.04 billion ($1.83 billion in 2012 dollars) worth of foreign direct investment (FDI) comprising four individual projects. The agency also issued its first reinsurance contracts signed in collaboration with Export Development Canada and the United States' Overseas Private Investment Corporation (OPIC).

The agency joined the Berne Union, an international community of export credit and investment insurance providers in 1994.

In 1997, MIGA issued the inaugural contract under its Cooperative Underwriting Program to support an energy project in Indonesia. In collaboration with the European Union Investment Trust Fund for Bosnia and Herzegovina, the agency set up a fund for investment guarantees amounting to $12 million ($17 million in 2012 dollars). The agency also established the West Bank and Gaza Investment Guarantee Trust Fund with a capacity of $20 million ($29 million in 2012 dollars).

In 1998, the Council of Governors of MIGA adopted a resolution establishing a general capital increase of $850 million ($1.2 billion in 2012 dollars), and transferring a grant of $150 million ($212 million in 2012 dollars) from the IBRD. MIGA exceeded $1 billion ($1.4 billion in 2012 dollars) in investment guarantees within a single year for the first time in 1999.

In 2000, MIGA paid its first insurance claim since the agency's founding.

In 2001, MIGA's issuance of new investment guarantees grew to $2 billion. The agency launched its Small Investment Program in 2005 in an effort to promote investment among small and medium enterprises. That same year, MIGA set up its Afghanistan Investment Guarantee Facility in an effort to promote FDI into Afghanistan.

In 2007, MIGA issued investment guarantees for a Djibouti port, marking its first support in the form of Islamic finance. The agency also launched PRI-Center.com (now no longer active) as a portal for information on political risk management and investment insurance, which also contained its FDI information services.

In 2009, the Board of Directors enacted changes to MIGA's operating procedures and authorized coverage for default of sovereign financial obligations. The agency also launched an annual publication titled World Investment and Political Risk which reports on trends in worldwide investment and corporate perceptions of prospects and risk, as well as shifts in the political risk insurance industry.

Although once dominated by large public and multilateral underwriters, private insurance firms accounted for approximately half of the political risk insurance market in 2007. As a result, MIGA has paid closer attention to exceptionally risky countries that have little appeal to foreign investors, and has insured projects among nations in the global south.

MIGA conducted a survey in 2010 which showed that political risk is the most important deterrent of long-term foreign direct investment in developing countries, even more than economic uncertainty and poor public infrastructure.

MIGA's Council of Governors amended the agency's convention in 2010 in an attempt to improve the organization's effectiveness by expanding the range of investments eligible for political risk insurance.

== Governance ==
MIGA is governed by its Council of Governors which represents its member countries. The Council of Governors holds corporate authority, but primarily delegates such powers to MIGA's board of directors. The Board of Directors consists of 25 directors and votes on matters brought before MIGA. Each director's vote is weighted in accordance with the total share capital of the member nations that director represents. MIGA's board is stationed at its Washington, D.C. headquarters where it meets regularly and oversees the agency's activities. The agency is led by its Executive Vice President, who directs its overall strategy and manages its daily operations, having continuously been a Japanese national since its founding. As of 16 December 2019, Hiroshi Matano serves as Executive Vice President of MIGA.

== Membership ==
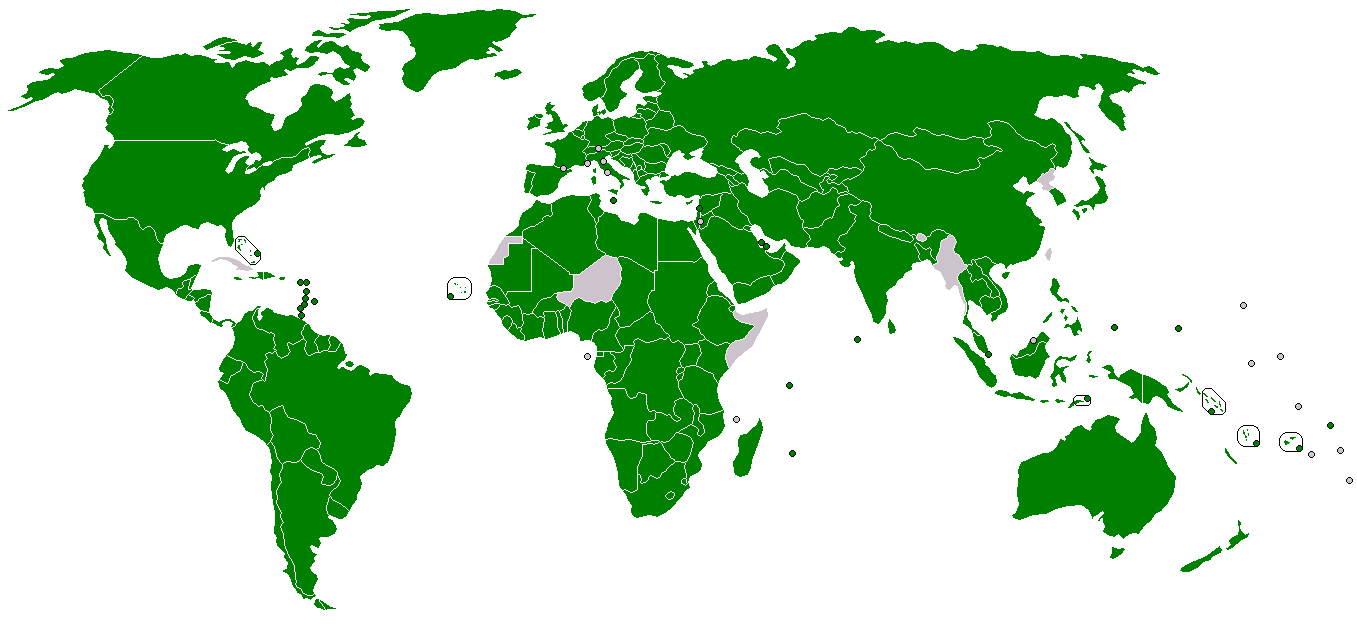
Multilateral Investment Guarantee Agency member states

MIGA is owned by its 182 member governments, consisting of 156 developing and 25 industrialized countries. The members are composed of 181 UN member states plus Kosovo. Membership in MIGA is available only to countries who are members of the World Bank, particularly the International Bank for Reconstruction and Development.

As of 2022, the six World Bank member states that are not MIGA members are Brunei, Kiribati, the Marshall Islands, San Marino, Tonga, and Tuvalu (the UN member states that are non-members of the World Bank, and thus MIGA, are Andorra, Cuba, Liechtenstein, Monaco, and North Korea). The Holy See and Palestine are also non-MIGA members.

Somalia is the most recent country to have joined MIGA, having done so in March 2020.

== Investment guarantees ==
MIGA offers insurance to cover five types of non-commercial risks: currency inconvertibility and transfer restriction; government expropriation; war, terrorism, and civil disturbance; breaches of contract; and the non-honoring of financial obligations. MIGA will cover investments such as equity, loans, shareholder loans, and shareholder loan guarantees. The agency may also insure investments such as management contracts, asset securitization, bonds, leasing activities, franchise agreements, and license agreements. The agency generally offers insurance coverage lasting up to 15 years with a possible five-year extension depending on a given project's nature and circumstances. When an event occurs that is protected by the insurance, MIGA can exercise the investor's rights against the host country through subrogation to recover expenses associated with covering the claim. However, the agency's convention does not require member governments to treat foreign investments in any special way. As a multilateral institution, MIGA is also in a position to attempt to sort out potential disputes before they ever turn into insurance claims. MIGA requires insured investors to establish communications and consultations with local communities and set in place grievance procedures.

The agency's Small Investment Program aims to promote FDI into specifically small and medium-sized enterprises. The program offers standard MIGA coverage types except it does not cover breaches of contract. Under the program, small and medium enterprises may take advantage of discounted insurance premiums and no application fees, which are not available to larger investors. To qualify an investment for the Small Investment Program, MIGA defines small and medium enterprise projects as having 300 or fewer employees, total assets not to exceed $15 million and annual revenues not to exceed $15 million. MIGA limits the request amount for the investment guarantee to $10 million, and will guarantee only up to 10 years with a possible 5-year extension.

MIGA's annual reports offer an overview of the agency's business.

== Financial performance ==
MIGA prepares consolidated financial statements in accordance with United States GAAP which are audited by KPMG.

== See also ==
- International Finance Corporation
- List of countries by FDI abroad
- List of countries by received FDI
- Overseas Private Investment Corporation (OPIC)
