= Export–Import Bank of the Republic of China =

Strategic state-owned bank of Taiwan

- Native name: 中國輸出入銀行
- Type: State-owned
- Industry: Banking
- Founded: 1979; 47 years ago
- Headquarters: Taipei, Taiwan
- Key people: Lin Shui-yung (chairperson); Liu Pei-jean (president)
- Products: Banking
- Services: Financial services
- Total assets: NT$111.54 billion (2016)
- Parent: Ministry of Finance (Taiwan)
- Website: www.eximbank.com.tw

The Export–Import Bank of the Republic of China (Chexim, or Taiwan EximBank) (Chinese: 中國輸出入銀行; pinyin: Zhōngguó Shūchū Rù Yínháng) is a state-owned enterprise of the Ministry of Finance of Taiwan. It primarily offers credit insurance for foreign investment originating in Taiwan. The company also insures against political risk such as nationalization, breach of contract, social unrest or war. Chexim is a member of Berne Union.

The bank is not related to the Beijing based Export–Import Bank of China (Chinese: 中國進出口銀行; pinyin: Zhōngguó Jìnchūkǒu Yínháng).

== History ==
The bank was established on 11 January 1979.

== Organizational structures ==
- Department of Loan and Guarantee
- Department of Export Insurance
- Department of Finance
- Department of Administrative Management
- Department of Risk Management
- Department of Accounting
- Personnel Office
- Ethics Office
- Information Management Section
- Compliance and Legal Affairs Section

== See also ==
- List of banks in Taiwan
- Ministry of Finance (Taiwan)
