= Ludovic Subran =

French economist (born 1991)

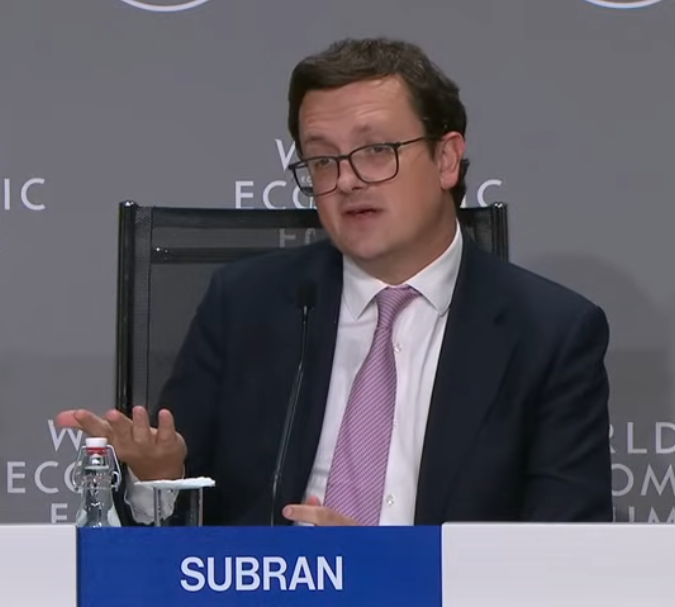
- At World Economic Forum 2024
- Born: 5 September 1981 (age 44); Tonneins, France
- Education: Ecole Nationale de la Statistique et de l’Administration Economique (ENSAE) (MSc in Statistics, 2002) and Paris Institute of Political Studies (MPP in Public Policy, 2006)
- Occupation: Economist
- Known for: Chief Economist at Allianz
- Honours: Chevalier de l' ordre national du mérite (2021)

Ludovic Subran (born 5 September 1981) is the Chief Investment Officer and Chief Economist of German financial services company Allianz. He also is a Senior Fellow at Harvard Kennedy School.

He is the author of "Ludonomics" a weekly newsletter on Allianz markets, macro, sector and insurance research.

Subran previously served as Chief Economist of Allianz Trade (formerly: Euler Hermes) and a board director of Solunion, the joint venture company for Spain and Latin America between Allianz Trade and Mapfre. Subran serves on the French Council of Economic Advisors (CAE / Conseil d'Analyse Economique), an economic policy advisory panel to the French Prime Minister, and is a Foreign Trade Advisor (Conseiller du Commerce Extérieur) since 2016.

Ludovic Subran is a Young Global Leader of the World Economic Forum, a Millennium Fellow of the Atlantic Council, and a David Rockefeller Fellow of the Trilateral Commission. The Institut Choiseul and Le Figaro listed him as one of the Top 100 French leaders below 40 years old from 2013 to 2019.

== Early life and education ==
Subran was born on 5 September 1981 in Tonneins, France. He graduated with a Master of Economics and Statistics from the National Institute of Statistics and Economic Studies (École Nationale de la Statistique et de l'Administration Économique) and with a Master in Public Policy from the Paris Institute of Political Studies (Institut d'Études Politiques de Paris). Subran also holds executive education certificates from Harvard and Stanford Universities.

He is an adjunct professor of economics at HEC Business School and Sciences Po Paris. He also teaches at Harvard Kennedy School.

== Career ==
After graduating, Subran joined the French Ministry of Economics and Finance in 2002, where he was responsible for short-term growth and inflation forecasts for the Eurozone and developed expertise in economic diagnostics for advanced economies.

In 2006, he joined the United Nations' World Food Programme as an economic advisor in the Office of the executive director. Based in Rome, he helped to develop and implement the humanitarian response to the 2007-2008 world food price crisis.

In 2009, he was appointed as a Social Protection Economist and team leader at the World Bank in Washington, DC. He led the technical assistance and lending operations in Latin America, the Caribbean, West Africa and the Middle East.

He has held several positions on the advisory board of EY France (2015-2019), the French Public Investment Bank (since 2015), and the Monaco Economic Board (since 2016). Subran is also a senior advisor to McLarty Associates, a firm that helps businesses understand policy and international markets.

He also sits on the board of non-profits, including the Aspen Institute France (2015-), BSI Economics (2017-) and Mercy Corps, one of the largest humanitarian NGOs in the world (2021). He was on the board of the Women in Africa Initiative, a platform for the economic development and support of African women entrepreneurs (2016-2019). He is a co-founder and board member of Recherches et Solidarités (2004-2019), a think-tank focusing on philanthropy in France.

Fluent in seven languages (French, English, Spanish, Italian, Portuguese, German and Arabic), Subran is often cited in the media for his expert economic views, including in such publications as Barron's, Bloomberg, CNBC, FAZ, Financial Times, Frankfurter Rundschau, Le Figaro, Le Monde, Les Echos, L'Opinion and WirtschaftsWoche. He regularly appears on BFMTV in Nicolas Doze's program "Les Experts."

In 2018, he was recognized as one of the top 40 under 40 by Wansquare, a French digital media outlet dedicated to economic and financial news. In 2020, he was ranked 62 by Richtopia among the world's Top 100 most influential economists.

== Awards ==
- Chevalier d' ordre national du mérite (2021)
- Young Global Leader of the World Economic Forum (2020)
- Atlantic Council Millennium Fellow (2019)
- Young Leader of the French American Foundation (2015-2016)

== Writing ==
=== Books ===
- Investing in a Changing Climate: Navigating Challenges and Opportunities (2023)(Co-author)
- L'économie décryptée (2022)
- Je comprends enfin l'Économie (2020)
- Désordre dans les Monnaies (contributor, 2015)
- Hunger and Markets (co-author, WFP 2006)

=== Peer-reviewed articles ===
- Williams, A., Cheston, T., Coudouel, A. & Subran, L. (2013). "Tailoring social protection to small island developing states : lessons learned from the Caribbean," Social Protection Discussion Papers and Notes 80105, The World Bank.
- Dorosh, P. A., & Subran, L. (2011). Food Aid, External Trade and Domestic Markets: Implications for Food Security in Darfur. Review of Market Integration, 3(2), 161–179.
- Brinkman, H. J., de Pee, S., Sanogo, I., Subran, L., & Bloem, M. W. (2010). High food prices and the global financial crisis have reduced access to nutritious food and worsened nutritional status and health. The Journal of nutrition, 140(1), 153S–61S.
- Bem, J., Mba, M. & Subran, L. (2008). 7. Précision des indicateurs de niveau de vie de l'enquête ECAM 2. Dans : Méthodes de sondage (pp. 209–214). Paris: Dunod.
