= EXIM Bank of Pakistan =

Official export credit agency of Pakistan

Coordinates: 33.7333°N 73.0887°E

Export-Import Bank of Pakistan
- Native name: ایکسپورٹ-امپورٹ بینک آف پاکستان
- Type: State-owned
- Industry: Banking
- Founded: 11 June 2015; 11 years ago (as public limited entity); October 2022; 3 years ago (by law)
- Headquarters: Islamabad, Pakistan
- Key people: Shahbaz H. Syed (President & CEO)
- Products: Financial services
- Owner: Government of Pakistan
- Rating: AAA (by PACRA)
- Website: eximbank.gov.pk

The Export-Import Bank of Pakistan, also known as the EXIM Bank of Pakistan (EBP), is the official export credit agency (ECA) of Pakistan. Headquartered in Pakistan's capital, Islamabad, the bank was established as a state-owned enterprise (SOE) in October 2022 to stimulate the growth and diversification of the country's exports and assist in the implementation of import substitution plans.

The EBP was initially incorporated with the Securities and Exchange Commission of Pakistan (SECP) as a public limited entity by the Pakistani government on 11 June 2015, and it was declared a Development Finance Institution (DFI) in December. However, the bank began formal operations years later, on October 2022, following its official establishment under the Export-Import Bank of Pakistan Act, 2022, which was ratified by the Senate on 30 September 2022 and signed into law by former President Arif Alvi on 14 October 2022. The bank was formally launched and inaugurated on 22 December 2023 by caretaker finance minister Shamshad Akhtar.

On 21 March 2025, the Economic Coordination Committee (ECC) approved phasing out the State Bank of Pakistan's long-term financing to the EBP.

== Overview ==
Per the EBP's website, the bank was established as the official export credit agency of Pakistan to support, develop and promote international trade and Pakistan's competitiveness in the international market by providing trade financing, trade credit insurance, equity participation, and trade services, among other services.

According to the Export-Import Bank of Pakistan Act, 2022, the EBP was established for the following purposes:

- Supporting, promoting and developing international trade, trade investments, export-oriented and imported substituting businesses and industries in accordance with the provisions of this Act and the national trade policies and programs of the Federal Government
- The administration, operation and management of such international trade schemes as may be transferred or outsourced to the Bank by the Federal Government or any of its agencies, or the State Bank, as a trustee, agent, or service provider.

The Exim Bank of Pakistan is mandated to provide innovative products to support the growth of exports and foreign direct investment by mitigating related risks. It will provide an enabling environment and level-playing field to Pakistan-based exporters.

As of June 2025, the EBP has a long-term credit rating of AAA as assessed by the Pakistan Credit Rating Agency (PACRA).

== See also ==
- List of banks in Pakistan
- Economy of Pakistan
- Foreign trade of Pakistan
