= Seoul Guarantee Insurance =

South Korean insurance company

Seoul Guarantee Insurance Company
- Native name: 서울보증보험 주식회사
- Company type: Public
- Traded as: KRX: 031210
- Industry: Insurance
- Founded: 1969 in South Korea
- Headquarters: Seoul, South Korea
- Areas served: South Korea, Middle East, Vietnam
- Key people: Lee Myung-Soon (CEO and president)
- Products: Insurance
- Owner: KDIC
- Website: sgic.co.kr

Seoul Guarantee Insurance Company (SGI; Korean: 서울보증보험 주식회사) is an insurance company headquartered in Seoul, South Korea. Founded in 1969, SGI provides contract bonds to facilitate the economic activities of individuals, businesses, and other bond types, including mobile phone installment payment bonds, mid-range interest rate loan bonds, and housing rental loan bonds. SGI is the largest provider of guarantee insurance in South Korea. At the end of 2024, SGI had a guarantee balance of US$344.4 billion. It listed on the Korea Exchange in 2025, debuting on the KOSPI market.

== History ==
=== Founding and merges (1969-1998) ===
Seoul Guarantee Insurance was founded in 1969 as Korea Fidelity and Surety Company (Korean: 대한보증보험), or Korea Guarantee Insurance, specializing in providing guarantees to businesses and individuals. Since the establishment of Hankuk Fidelity and Surety Company (Korean: 한국보증보험) in 1989, these two guarantee insurance companies created a competitive market environment. However, following the 1997 financial crisis, the two companies merged in November 1998, adopting the name Seoul Guarantee Insurance (SGI). During the 1997 Asian financial crisis, SGI received substantial public funding.

=== Insolvency and government revival (1999-2003) ===
In 1999, the Financial Supervisory Service conducted a due diligence assessment of SGI revealing that the company was insolvent, with liabilities exceeding assets by 3.79 trillion won. Unpaid insurance claims totaled 3.4 trillion won, while liquid assets were only 1.08 trillion won. Despite this, an evaluation committee under the Financial Services Commission determined that business recovery was possible with government and external funding and an improved business environment. Given the lack of alternatives for credit guarantees for low-income households and SMEs in the short term, the government decided to revive SGI. In June, the FSC designated it as a distressed financial company. The Korea Deposit Insurance Corporation invested 1.25 trillion won, and the Korea Asset Management Corporation deferred certain payments until March 2001. The company’s outstanding shares were written off and retired. SGI launched a subsidiary in Dubai in 2022, with SGI MENA located in the Dubai International Financial Centre. As of 2023, SGI was operating in Vietnam. In 2023, the KDIC sought to list SGI to recover about 5 trillion won ($3.74 billion) of the 10 trillion won in public funds injected during the crisis, but it withdrew the plan due to unfavorable market conditions.

=== Recent developments (2024-2026) ===
At the end of 2024, SGI had a guarantee balance of US$344.4 billion. In March 2025, it listed on the Korea Exchange, with its debut on the KOSPI market in March 2025 allowing the KDIC to recover 181.5 billion won. SGI was the first state-owned company in South Korea to go public in 15 years. By the summer of 2025, SGI was the largest provider of guarantee insurance in South Korea. Lee Myung-Soon was SGI CEO and president. The state-run Korea Deposit Insurance Corp. held an 83% stake in SGI.

In July 2025, a government investigation confirmed that SGI had been hit by a ransomware attack, with most services knocked out for days. SGI had been sent untraceable emails, refused the demands, and turned the matter over to the Korea Financial Intelligence Unit. SGI said there was no evidence of data breach. It restored its core computer systems after four days. On March 26, 2026, KDIC sold a 4.3% stake in SGI for US$112 million.

== Services ==
As of 2023, SGI provides contract bonds to facilitate the economic activities of individuals, businesses, and other bond types, including mobile phone installment payment bonds, mid-range interest rate loan bonds, and housing rental loan bonds. According to the International Credit Insurance & Surety Association in 2023, the company ranked among the top four globally regarding original insurance premium revenues.

== See also ==
- List of largest insurance companies
