= Korean Re =

Reinsurance company in South Korea

Korean Reinsurance Company
- Type: Public
- Traded as: KRX: 003690
- Industry: Financial services
- Founded: 1963; 63 years ago
- Headquarters: Seoul, South Korea
- Products: Reinsurance, insurance
- Number of employees: 320
- Website: koreanre.co.kr

Korean Reinsurance Company (commonly Korean Re; Korean: 코리안리재보험) is a reinsurance company based in Seoul, South Korea. In 2020, Korean Re ranked as the world's 10th largest reinsurer in terms of gross written premiums.

== History ==
Founded in 1963 as a state-funded enterprise, Korean Re was privatized in 1978.

In October 2002, it was nominated as 'Reinsurance Company of the Year' by Asia Insurance Review. In May 2010, Korean Re was selected as "Emerging Market Player of the Year" by Reinsurance Magazine.

== Business ==
Korean Re has a diversified underwriting portfolio that consists of personal business (long-term, motor, and life reinsurance) and commercial lines (property, marine, casualty, and bond reinsurance). Over the last decade, Korean Re has expanded into overseas markets. As of 2015, more than 22% of its gross written premiums were generated from abroad. Korean Re has a network of one branch office in Singapore, two subsidiaries in Hong Kong and London, and five international liaison offices.

Premium Volume	FY2015 (USD million)	FY2014 (USD million)	Year Over Year Change
Gross Written Premiums	5,580.2	5,637.5	6.6%
Net Written Premiums	3,833.0	3,697.7	11.6%
Earned Premiums	3,726.6	3,692.3	8.7%
Ceded Premiums	1,747.2	1,939.8	-3.0%

Korean Re's gross written premiums for 2015 increased by 6.6% USD 5,580.2 million, recovering from the slowing trend over the previous two years. This growth was driven by an increase in personal lines, such as long term and life insurance. A strong rebound in premium income from overseas property and casualty treaties also bolstered the overall top-line growth. Korean Re expected to see its net profit for 2016 hit a new high on growing demand for its reinsurance packages from top insurance companies.

Korean Re saw an increase in the number of new contracts with top insurers after Standard & Poor's raised its credit rating by one notch to A from A− in 2014. S&P hiked the rating two years prior when Korean Re successfully increased capital by issuing $200 million worth hybrid securities for the first time.
