= Prognos =

Swiss consulting company

Prognos AG
- Type: Aktiengesellschaft
- Industry: research and development
- Founded: 1959
- Founder: Edgar Salin and six other professors
- Headquarters: Basel, Switzerland
- Key people: Christian Böllhoff (Managing partner); Jan Giller (Chairman of the board of directors)
- Number of employees: approximately 250
- Website: www.prognos.com

Prognos AG is an economic and social science research and consulting company based in Basel, with further offices in Germany, Belgium and Austria. The company works for public and private clients and produces analyses, reports, studies, and scenarios on economic and social issues.

== History ==
Prognos AG was founded in Basel on 6 October 1959 by Edgar Salin (1892–1974) and six other professors.

The first Prognos Deutschland Report, Die Bundesrepublik Deutschland 1950–1970, was published in 1965.

In March 1971, the Swiss Bank Corporation acquired a majority shareholding in Prognos. At that time, the company had 75 employees.

In 1980, the first German branch was opened in Cologne. It was later moved to Düsseldorf. In the same year, the number of employees was 120. In 1982, Prognos acquired a 50% stake in IKB Consult GmbH, which had been founded by Industriekreditbank AG (IKB) in Düsseldorf. In 1985, the Swiss Bank Corporation transferred its shares to Schweizerische Treuhandgesellschaft (STG), which belonged to the same group.

Prognos opened what was then its largest office in Berlin in 1986. The Stuttgart-based Holtzbrinck Publishing Group then acquired 50% of Prognos shares from Schweizerische Treuhandgesellschaft and a further 5% from the only free shareholder, becoming the new majority shareholder. In 1991, Holtzbrinck Publishing Group increased its shareholding to 75%, while Schweizerische Treuhandgesellschaft retained 25% of the shares.

In August 1995, Holtzbrinck Publishing Group acquired the remaining Prognos shares and became the sole shareholder. Further Prognos offices were opened in Brussels and Bremen in 1999. In December 2002, the twentieth Prognos Zukunftsforum took place.

On 1 January 2014, ProgTrans AG merged with Prognos AG. As part of the succession arrangement for the founder and managing director of ProgTrans AG, Prognos AG acquired all shares in ProgTrans AG and became its sole owner. ProgTrans AG thereby returned to its original parent company.

== Company profile ==
The company prepares analyses and scenarios on economic, political and social issues and provides strategy consulting. Its work covers economic research and consulting projects for public and private clients. Typical opinion polling, election research and demoscopic research are not part of the company's activities.

In addition to economic topics, Prognos AG works on socio-political issues including education, social affairs, family policy and health. Other fields of work include international competitiveness, industrial and structural policy, digitalisation, trade relations and energy and climate policy issues. The company also produces analyses of the energy transition and studies on the long-term economic and fiscal effects of political reforms, including reforms of social security systems. Prognos also provides consulting services, including the development of corporate strategies and support during implementation.

Its work often examines developments over periods of ten years and more.

In addition to its headquarters in Basel, Prognos has its largest office in Berlin. Further offices are located in Bremen, Brussels, Düsseldorf, Munich, Stuttgart, Freiburg im Breisgau, Hamburg and Vienna. Prognos AG is therefore represented at ten locations in Switzerland, Germany, Belgium, and Austria.

The clients of Prognos AG include medium-sized and large companies, institutions from various political, economic and social fields, including foundations, associations, state and federal ministries, and other public-sector organisations from administration and civil society. Prognos states that its activities are financed exclusively through commissioned projects and that it receives no institutional or private funding.

As of 2026, Prognos AG employs approximately 250 people.

=== Subject areas ===
The work of Prognos AG is divided into five subject areas, all of which are distributed across several locations. These areas are further divided into subcategories. The subject areas are:

- Economy and labour
- Innovation and digitalisation
- Energy and climate
- Regions and infrastructure
- Society and state

== Publications ==
The studies produced by Prognos AG consist of econometric analyses and scenarios. Its projects also include regional structural and location analyses, participation and dialogue procedures, impact analyses, evaluations and monitoring, and assessments of political and legislative consequences. In addition to individual projects, the company publishes regular reports, atlas series and future studies. The Prognos Zukunftsatlas is a regular assessment of all German districts and independent cities carried out by Prognos AG in cooperation with Handelsblatt. These district-level entities are placed in a ranking on the basis of various weighted metrics. The Zukunftsatlas has been published every three years since 2004.

=== Examples ===
In 2023, Prognos and the Forum Ökologisch-Soziale Marktwirtschaft prepared a study for the Bertelsmann Stiftung on the need to reform environmentally and climate-damaging subsidies in Germany. The study analysed the economic, ecological and social effects of possible subsidy reforms.

In 2024, Prognos and the Leipzig Institute for Energy prepared a study for the Thuringian Ministry for the Environment, Energy, and Nature Conservation on achieving greenhouse gas neutrality in Thuringia by 2045. The study analysed and quantified the investment required for climate protection measures in industry, transport, buildings, and agriculture for the period from 2025 to 2045.

In 2025, Prognos published a study commissioned by the Federation of German Industries on the financing of the German health system. The study analysed efficiency potential arising from medical, technological and digital innovations in the industrial health economy.

Prognos was also a project partner in an ex-post evaluation commissioned by the European Commission Directorate-General for Regional and Urban Policy on the contribution of cohesion policy to the European Green Deal, with case studies in several EU member states.
