= UK Export Finance =

Ministerial department of the UK Government

UK Export Finance Welsh: Cyllid Allforio y DU

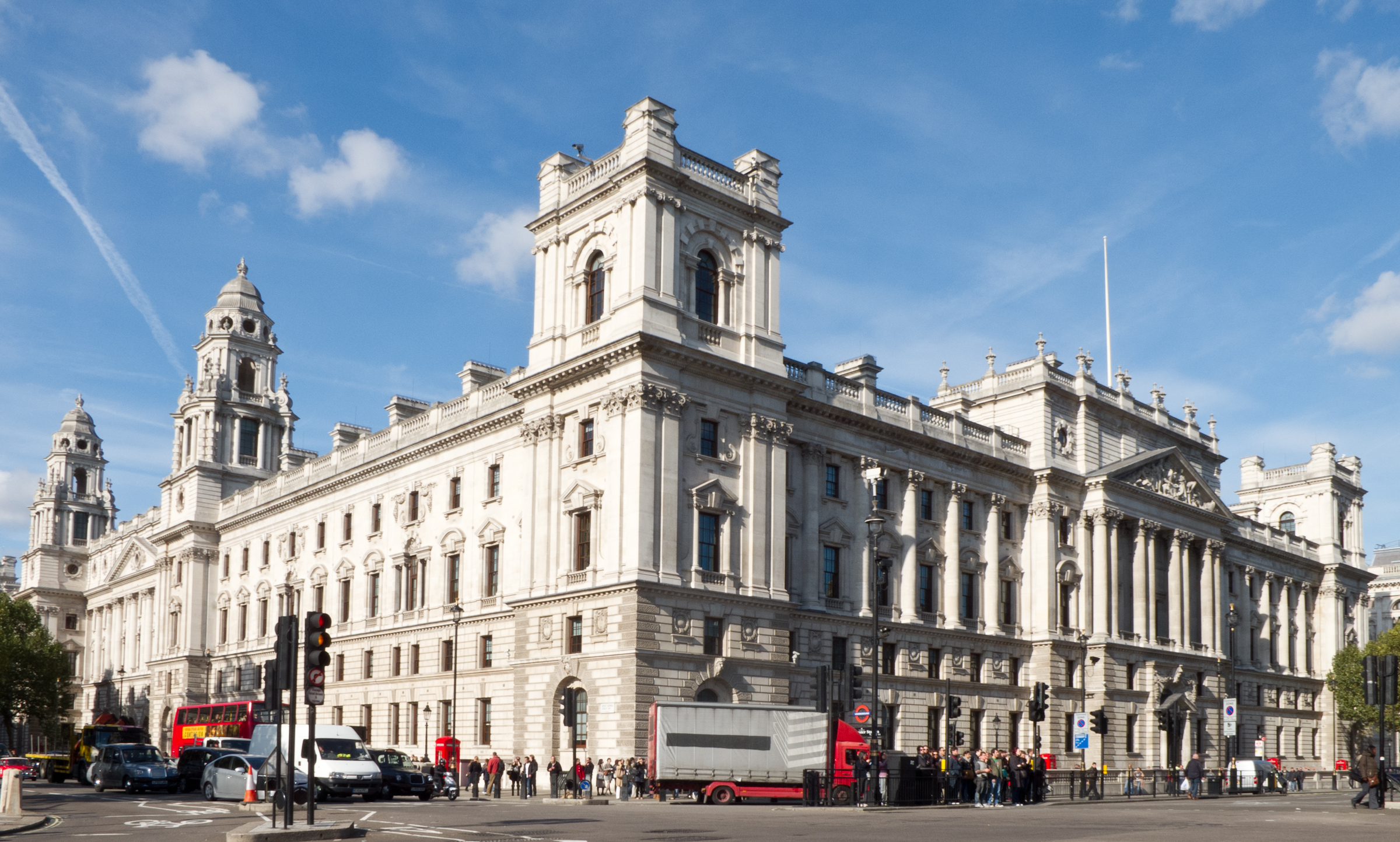
- Government Offices, Great George Street

Department overview
- Formed: 1919
- Jurisdiction: United Kingdom
- Headquarters: 1 Horse Guards Road, Westminster, London
- Department executive: Tim Reid, chief executive
- Child Department: Export Guarantees Advisory Council
- Website: www.gov.uk/government/organisations/uk-export-finance

The Export Credits Guarantee Department (ECGD), branded as UK Export Finance (UKEF), is the export credit agency and a ministerial department of the Government of the United Kingdom.

In 1920, the ECGD had a maximum total exposure of just £26 million. Today, its maximum commitment stands at £80 billion.

== History ==
The department was established in 1919 to promote UK exports, lost during the submarine blockade of World War I.

== Activities ==
=== Powers ===
Export and Investment Guarantees Act 1991 (Note: Section 15(1).)
- Act of Parliament
- Parliament of the United Kingdom
- Long title: An Act to make new provision as to the functions exercisable by the Secretary of State through the Export Credits Guarantee Department; and make provision as to the delegation of any such functions and the transfer of property, rights and liabilities attributable to the exercise of any such functions.
- Citation: 1991 c. 67
- Territorial extent: United Kingdom

Dates
- Royal assent: 22 October 1991
- Commencement: 23 October 1991 (Note: Section 15(6). The Export and Investment Guarantees Act 1991 (Commencement) Order 1991.)
Other legislation
Repeals/revokes	Export Guarantees and Overseas Investment Act 1978
Amended by	Statute Law (Repeals) Act 2004; Industry and Exports (Financial Assistance) Act 2026

Status: Amended

Text of statute as originally enacted

Revised text of statute as amended

Text of the Export and Investment Guarantees Act 1991 as in force today (including any amendments) within the United Kingdom, from legislation.gov.uk.

UKEF derives its powers from the Export and Investment Guarantees Act 1991 (c. 67) and undertakes its activities in accordance with specific consent from HM Treasury. The UK Government states that:

In recent years we have supported business in the aerospace, automotive, construction, healthcare, industrial processing, oil and gas, petrochemical, water treatment, and satellite sectors.

— UK Export Finance, gov.uk

UKEF's aim is to benefit the UK economy by helping exporters of UK goods and services to win business, and UK firms to invest overseas by providing guarantees, insurance and reinsurance against loss, taking into account HM Government's wider international policy agenda. UKEF is required by the HM Government to operate slightly better than break even, by charging premiums from exporters at levels that match the perceived risks and costs in each case.

It has three broad product types:

1. Guarantees on loans to buyers of UK goods and services outside the UK. Sometimes it will also fund these loans itself.
2. Guarantees on trade finance facilities (loans or contingent liability facilities e.g. performance bonds) extended by UK banks to exporting companies in the UK.
3. Insurance against the risk of non-payment for UK companies selling to buyers outside the UK.

The highest value part of UKEF's activities is the first type: underwriting long-term loans to support the sale of capital goods, principally for the export of aircraft, bridges, machinery, and services; it helps UK companies take part in major overseas projects such as the upgrading of hospitals, airports, and power stations. Some of the projects UKEF backs go well beyond the £1 billion mark.

As part of its risk management process, UKEF has to make a judgement on the ability of a buyer or borrower (often a country) to meet its debt obligations. For country debt, department uses a "productive expenditure" test, undertaken in consultation with the Foreign, Commonwealth and Development Office, that makes sure that the countries defined as heavily indebted poor countries and those exclusively dependent on International Development Association financing only get official export credits from the UK for projects that help social and economic development without creating a new unsustainable debt burden. UKEF continues to check that the proposed borrowing is sustainable.

=== Support for smaller UK exporters ===
In 1991, ECGD's 'short term' credit business was sold to Dutch insurer NCM Group in 1991, later becoming part of Atradius in 2004. However, since 2011, due to the 2008 financial crisis, it re-entered the 'short term' market, with new products aimed at smaller UK exporters to help them access finance and trade credit insurance. It also introduced a network of Export Finance Managers specifically to support smaller UK exporters on the financial aspects of international trade. This business tends to be of lower value, but it supports a larger number of UK companies, typically small and medium businesses, which since 2015 have typically made up the majority of UKEF's customers.

The Small Business, Enterprise and Employment Act 2015 included provision for UKEF to support UK businesses involved in, and intending to engage in, exporting and exporting supply chains, including "where there are complex contracting chains and financing arrangements or where exports are made via overseas subsidiaries or joint venture companies", and with particular reference to exports of intellectual property rights and other intangibles.

== Impact ==
UKEF publishes an annual report outlining its activities and its performance against financial objectives set for it by HM Treasury. It also estimates its contribution to UK GDP and jobs.

== Historic criticisms of ECGD ==
The ECGD has been the subject of criticism by UK-based NGOs, including:

- In the early 2000s, the Corner House claimed that the ECGD provided public subsidy for bribery. ECGD conducted a public consultation about its anti-bribery and corruption procedures in 2005.
- Campaign Against Arms Trade argued that the ECGD provided excessive levels of support for arms sales.
- Jubilee Debt Campaign argued that the cancellation of debts owed to the ECGD should not be counted towards UK Official Development Assistance figures.
- World Wide Fund for Nature argued that excessive greenhouse gases are emitted from ECGD-supported projects and that this is inconsistent with wider UK environmental policy.

=== Fossil fuels ===
The ECGD was criticised for prioritising investment in fossil fuels over renewable energy. A CAFOD report showed that from 2010 to 2017, an estimated 97% of ECGD energy-related support went to fossil fuel development, principally oil and gas exploration and production in upper-middle-income countries. Just 3% went to renewables. The Guardian reported that in the 2018–2019 financial year, ECGD committed nearly £2 billion in support to fossil fuel projects across the world. A 2019 parliamentary inquiry called on ECGD to stop funding fossil fuel projects by the end of 2021, citing that the scale of fossil fuel support violated the UK's obligations under the Paris Agreement.

In December 2020, UKEF ended all future support for the fossil fuel sector overseas and is now considered one of the Export Credit Agencies most closely aligned with the 2015 Paris Agreement.

== Defence exports ==
While historically, the proportion of ECGD's business in support of weapons exports ranged from 30% to 50%, this declined to under 1% in 2009–2010. However, it has since increased significantly following Russia's invasion of Ukraine, including a £7.7 billion of support for Poland's NAREW air defence programme.

UKEF seeks advice on arms sales from the United Kingdom Export Control Organisation (ECO), part of the Department for Business and Trade. All applications are assessed, on a case-by-case basis, against the consolidated EU and National Arms Export Licensing criteria.

The ECO's advice is not always followed by the government, though. In February 2016, the head of the Export Control Organisation, Edward Bell, advised Business Secretary Sajid Javid that Britain should suspend arms sales to Saudi Arabia. This advice was not followed by the business secretary and prime minister.

== Equivalent organisations abroad ==
- China: Exim Bank of China
- France: Bpifrance Assurance Export, a subsidiary of Bpifrance. Before 2017 it was managed by Coface.
- Germany: Allianz Trade
- Italy: Servizi Assicurativi del Commercio Estero
- India: Exim Bank of India
- USA: Export-Import Bank of the United States
