= Export Finance Australia =

Agency overview
- Formed: 1 November 1991
- Jurisdiction: Commonwealth of Australia
- Employees: 105–115
- Annual budget: A$38.6 million (2006)
- Agency executive: John Hopkins, Managing director & CEO
- Parent agency: Department of Foreign Affairs and Trade
- Website: www.exportfinance.gov.au

Export Finance Australia, formerly known as the Export Finance and Insurance Corporation (EFIC), is an Australian government agency responsible for supporting the country's export activities. It operates under the Export Finance and Insurance Corporation Act 1991 (Cth) as a statutory corporation fully owned by the Commonwealth of Australia.

Established in its current form on 1 November 1991, Export Finance Australia offers flexible financial solutions to promote Australian exports and contribute to overseas infrastructure development. The agency collaborates with banks, financial institutions, government bodies such as the Department of Foreign Affairs and Trade, Austrade, and international financiers.

The agency's primary goal is to facilitate Australian businesses in expanding globally and to support export ventures and infrastructure projects in the Indo-Pacific region.

== Role and function ==
Export Finance Australia’s mandate enables it to support a wide range of export-related transactions and projects, including:

- small and medium-sized enterprises
- overseas infrastructure development in the Pacific and broader Indo-Pacific region
- defence exports through the Defence Export Facility
- support for critical minerals projects and businesses in the critical minerals export supply chain through the $2 billion Critical Minerals Facility

== Commonwealth entities ==
Export Finance Australia contributes to broader government objectives by providing expertise and support to the following Commonwealth entities, as directed by the Minister for Trade and Tourism:

- Australian Infrastructure Financing Facility for the Pacific, which supports infrastructure in the Pacific and Timor-Leste
- National Housing Finance and Investment Corporate, which improves housing outcomes to encourage investment in social and affordable housing.
- Northern Australian Infrastructure Facility, which provides loans to infrastructure projects that benefit Northern Australia.

== Criticism of Export Finance Corporation ==
The 2020–21 Budget set a record for secrecy, with 384 ‘not for publication’ items, up from 193 the previous year. Spending measures hidden from public view included all expenditure related to Australia’s Export Finance and Insurance Corporation, which has a record of supporting controversial mining and fossil fuel projects. The Australia Institute warns that this growing lack of transparency erodes democratic accountability.

Prior to this, The Australia Institute had cautioned in a submission that draft legislation put forth by the Coalition that would do away with the requirement to only fund exporters that manufacture "substantially or wholly in Australia" could allow the Export Finance and Insurance Corporation to play a key role in the "further offshoring of Australian manufacturing."
