= Belgian Export Credit Agency =

Credendo
- Company type: Credit Insurance Group
- Industry: Insurance
- Founded: 1921 The parent company started its activities in Belgium 1939 Nationale Delcrederedienst | Office National du Ducroire (ONDD) becomes an autonomous public financial body with a state guarantee
- Headquarters: Brussels, Belgium
- Key people: Dirk Terweduwe (CEO), Frank Vanwingh (Deputy CEO), Nabil Jijakli (Deputy CEO)
- Products: Trade credit insurance, Financing, Bonding, Investment insurance, Financial guarantees, Risk participation, Reinsurance
- Number of employees: 530
- Website: credendo.com/en

Credendo is a European credit insurance group present throughout the European continent, headquartered in Brussels and located in 15 countries. It provides customised options for insurance, reinsurance, guarantees, surety and financing related to domestic and international trade transactions or investments abroad. It protects companies, banks and insurance undertakings against credit and political risks or facilitates the financing of such transactions.

Credendo is 100% owned by the Belgian state. The parent company's official name is Delcredere | Ducroire, but the commonly used brand name is Credendo – Export Credit Agency. It has the status of a public institution. Since the rebranding process of January 2017, the parent and all subsidiaries share the same name: Credendo.

Credendo credit insurance activities can be separated into two parts.

- Operations with guarantee from the Belgian state (public credit insurance) to support Belgian exports. For this type of insurance, the transactions covered have to contain a Belgian interest. This part of the activities belongs to Credendo – Export Credit Agency, which acts as a traditional Export Credit Agency (ECA). It's established in Brussels (Belgium).
- Transactions covered without guarantee from the Belgian state (private credit insurance). The most common product is the whole turnover credit insurance policy, besides surety. There are subsidiaries and branches all over Europe.

== History and name ==
Credendo is one of the oldest credit insurance companies. In 1921 the Belgian Ministry of Economic Affairs set up a Delcredere Committee to promote Belgian exports. In 1935 the committee is separated from the Ministry and becomes the Belgian Export Credit Agency ‘Office National du Ducroire | Nationale Delcrederedienst’ (ONDD). In 1939 a complete reorganisation takes place: the agency is transformed into an autonomous public financial body with a state guarantee. Up till now, export credit agency services remain the group's core activity.
