= Export Credit Guarantee Corporation of India =

Export Credit provider in India

ECGC Limited
- Type: Government of India Enterprise
- Industry: Insurance
- Founded: 30 July 1957
- Headquarters: Mumbai, Maharashtra, India
- Key people: Sristiraj Ambastha (Chairman & MD)
- Products: Export Credit Insurance
- Owner: Ministry of Commerce and Industry, Government of India
- Website: ecgc.in

ECGC Limited (Formerly Export Credit Guarantee Corporation of India Limited) is a government owned export credit agency of India. It is under the ownership of the Ministry of Commerce and Industry, Government of India, and is headquartered in Mumbai, Maharashtra. It provides export credit insurance support to Indian exporters and banks. Its topmost official is designated as Chairman and Managing Director.

The Government of India had initially set up Export Risks Insurance Corporation (ERIC) in July 1957. It was transformed into Export Credit and Guarantee Corporation Limited (ECGC) in 1964 and to Export Credit Guarantee Corporation of India in 1983.

== History ==
ECGC Ltd., was established on 30 July 1957 to strengthen the export promotion by covering the risk of exporting on credit. It functions under the administrative control of the Department of Commerce, Ministry of Commerce and Industry, Government of India. It is managed by an Asset Management Company comprising representatives of the Government, Reserve Bank of India, banking, insurance and exporting community.

The name of the company has been changed from Export Credit Guarantee Corporation of India Limited to ECGC Limited with effect from 8 August 2014 as per the certificate issued by the Deputy Registrar of Companies, Registrar of Companies, Mumbai.

ECGC Ltd. is the seventh largest credit insurer in the world in terms of coverage of national exports. The present paid-up capital of the company is ₹3,190 crores and authorised capital is ₹5,000 crores.

== Functions ==
- Provides a range of credit risk insurance covers to exporters against loss in export of goods and services as well.
- Offers guarantees to banks and financial institutions to enable exporters to obtain better facilities from them.
- Provides Overseas Investment Insurance to Indian companies investing in joint ventures abroad in the form of equity or loan and advances.

== Facilities provided by ECGC ==
- Offers insurance protection to exporters against payment risks
- Offers insurance protection to Exporters against Payment risks in Domestic Sales
- Provides guidance in export-related activities
- Makes available information on different countries with its own credit ratings
- Makes it easy to obtain export finance from banks/financial institutions
- Assists exporters in recovering bad debt
- Provides information on credit-worthiness of overseas buyers
- Short-Term Export Credit Insurance

== Need for export credit insurance ==
Payments for exports are open to risks even at the best of times. The risks have assumed large proportions today due to the far-reaching political and economic changes that are sweeping the world. An outbreak of war or civil war may block or delay payment for goods exported. A coup or an insurrection may also bring about the same result. Economic difficulties or balance of payment problems may lead a country to impose restrictions on either import of certain goods or on transfer of payments for goods imported. In addition, the exporters have to face commercial risks of protracted delays in payment, or the insolvency or the default of buyers. The commercial risks of a foreign buyer going bankrupt or losing his capacity to pay are aggravated due to the political and economic uncertainties. Export credit insurance is designed to protect exporters from the consequences of the payment risks, both political and commercial, and to enable them to expand their overseas business without fear of loss.

Cooperation agreement with MIGA (Multilateral Investment Guarantee Agency) an arm of World Bank. MIGA provides:

1. Political insurance for foreign investment in developing countries.
2. Technical assistance to improve investment climate.
3. Dispute mediation service.
4. It helps the exporter

Under this agreement protection is available against political and economic risks such as transfer restriction, expropriation, war, terrorism and civil disturbances etc...

== Notable records ==
- Largest Policy – short term ₹450 Crore
- Largest database on buyers – ₹8 Lakh
- Largest credit limit – ₹80 Crore
- Largest claim paid – ₹540 Crore
- Quickest claim paid – 2 days
- Highest compensation – ₹788 Crore to Iraq

ECGC Ltd. now offers various products for the exporters and bankers. If readymade products are not suited to an exporter/banker, then ECGC designs tailormade products for them.
