= Nippon Export and Investment Insurance =

Japanese export credit agency

- 日本貿易保険

Agency overview
- Formed: April 1, 2001 (as incorporated administrative agency); April 1, 2017 (as stock company)
- Jurisdiction: Government of Japan
- Headquarters: Tokyo, Japan
- Employees: 195 (as of April 1, 2019)
- Agency executive: Atsuo Kuroda, Chairman and CEO
- Parent agency: Ministry of Economy, Trade and Industry
- Website: www.nexi.go.jp/en/

The Nippon Export and Investment Insurance (日本貿易保険, Nihon Bōeki Hoken), known as NEXI, is Japan's official export credit agency, a corporation wholly owned by the Government of Japan and operating under the jurisdiction of the Ministry of Economy, Trade and Industry (METI). It provides trade and investment insurance covering risks that arise in exports, overseas investments and international lending and that private-sector insurers are typically unable to cover.

== History ==
Japan's trade and investment insurance system was created under the Trade and Investment Insurance Act, enacted in March 1950, and for about fifty years it was administered directly by the government, initially by the Ministry of International Trade and Industry and later by METI. On 1 April 2001, NEXI was established as an incorporated administrative agency to manage the program as a wholly state-owned body, while METI retained responsibility for overall policy and for negotiations between governments. After sixteen years in that form, NEXI was reorganized on 1 April 2017 into a stock company (kabushiki kaisha) wholly owned by the Japanese government. At that time the previous government reinsurance arrangement was abolished, and the state instead undertook, under the Trade and Investment Insurance Act, to support NEXI's ability to pay claims in an emergency.

== Operations ==
NEXI underwrites three main categories of cover, namely export insurance, investment insurance and loan insurance. Its policies protect Japanese exporters, investors and lending banks against political risks such as war, revolution, restrictions on foreign-exchange conversion or remittance, and other force majeure events, as well as commercial risks such as the bankruptcy or default of a foreign counterparty. Because the cover is backed by the credit of the Japanese government, it is intended to let Japanese companies take part in higher-risk markets and in large infrastructure and energy projects where private insurance capacity is limited.

== See also ==
- Ministry of Economy, Trade and Industry
- Japan Bank for International Cooperation
- Japan External Trade Organization
