= Trade credit insurance =

Insurance protecting businesses against losses from customer non-payment of trade debts

Trade credit insurance, business credit insurance, export credit insurance, or credit insurance is a type of insurance policy and a risk management product offered by private insurance companies and governmental export credit agencies to business entities wishing to protect their accounts receivable from loss due to credit risks such as protracted default, insolvency or bankruptcy. This insurance product is a type of property and casualty insurance, and should not be confused with such products as credit life or credit disability insurance, which individuals obtain to protect against the risk of loss of income needed to pay debts. Trade credit insurance can include a component of political risk insurance which is offered by the same insurers to insure the risk of non-payment by foreign buyers due to currency issues, political unrest, expropriation etc.

This points to the major role trade credit insurance plays in facilitating international trade. Trade credit is offered by vendors to their customers as an alternative to prepayment or cash on delivery terms, providing time for the customer to generate income from sales to pay for the product or service. This requires the vendor to assume non-payment risk. In a local or domestic situation as well as in an export transaction, the risk increases when laws, customs communications and customer's reputation are not fully understood. In addition to increased risk of non-payment, international trade presents the problem of the time between product shipment and its availability for sale. The account receivable is like a loan and represents capital invested, and often borrowed, by the vendor. But this is not a secure asset until it is paid. If the customer's debt is credit insured the large, risky asset becomes more secure, like an insured building. This asset may then be viewed as collateral by lending institutions and a loan based upon it used to defray the expenses of the transaction and to produce more product. Trade credit insurance is, therefore, a trade finance tool.

Trade credit insurance is purchased by business entities to insure their accounts receivable from loss due to the insolvency of the debtors. The product is not available to individuals. The cost (premium) for this is usually charged monthly, and is calculated as a percentage of sales for that month or as a percentage of all outstanding receivables.

Trade credit insurance usually covers a portfolio of buyers and pays an agreed percentage of an invoice or receivable that remains unpaid as a result of protracted default, insolvency or bankruptcy. Policy holders must apply a credit limit on each of their buyers for the sales to that buyer to be insured. The premium rate reflects the average credit risk of the insured portfolio of buyers. In addition, credit insurance can also cover single transactions or trade with only one buyer.

A 2020 report suggested that in the United States, at least $600 billion in annual sales was underpinned by trade credit insurance and $50 billion of sales were lost where insurance could not be secured. On November 20, 2025, a Morningstar DBRS' credit note stated that "trade credit insurance exposure reached a record EUR 3.5 trillion in 2024, despite a slight decline in gross written premiums".

== History ==
Historical antecedents of trade credit insurance (and even of credit derivatives, more indirectly) date back at least to the 1860s, when Johns Hopkins endorsed the notes of persons and firms whom he judged to be worthy credit risks, for a price (of up to 5%), making it easier for a note bearer to discount a note, that is, to sell it to another firm or to a bank. This helped to increase the salability of commercial paper, which stimulated trade, especially in a world before credit cards. Hopkins made his credit risk assessments entirely in his head based on intuition guided by firsthand knowledge of the note's author and how he ran his business. In this respect his endorsing of paper was quite different from today's reliance on credit reporting; Hopkins said, "I do not want any report of any kind. I rely on my own judgment and that judgment does not fail me." It had much in common with Hopkins's main activity, investing, being essentially another form of placing bets on businesses and businessmen who he thought were likely to succeed. The practice of endorsing notes for a fee had been known in London before Hopkins's activity in the U.S. but had been nearly unknown in the U.S.

Formalized trade credit insurance was born at the end of the nineteenth century, but it was mostly developed in Western Europe between the First and Second World Wars. Several companies were founded in many countries; some of them also managed the political risks of export on behalf of their state.

Following the privatisation of the short-term side of the UK's Export Credits Guarantee Department in 1991, a concentration of the trade credit insurance market took place and three groups now account for over 85% of the global credit insurance market. These main players focused on Western Europe, but rapidly expanded towards Eastern Europe, Asia and the Americas:

- Euler Hermes, merger of the two credit insurance companies of the Allianz Group. Euler Hermes is the world's number one credit insurance provider.
- Coface, a wholly owned subsidiary of Natixis, the financing, asset management and financial services arm of the BPCE Group. Coface has the largest direct presence in the world.
- Atradius, a merger between NCM and Gerling Kreditversicherung. Later renamed Atradius after it was demerged from the Gerling insurance group.

Many variations of trade credit insurance have evolved ranging from coverage that can be canceled or reduced at an insurers discretion, to coverage that cannot be canceled or reduced by the insurer during the policy period. Other programs may allow the policy holder to act as the underwriter.

While trade credit insurance is often mostly known for protecting foreign or export accounts receivable, there has always been a large segment of the market that uses trade credit insurance for domestic accounts receivable protection as well. Domestic trade credit insurance provides companies with the protection they need as their customer base consolidates creating larger receivables to fewer customers. This further creates a larger exposure and greater risk if a customer does not pay their accounts. The addition of new insurers in this area have increased the availability of domestic cover for companies.

Many businesses found that their insurers withdrew trade credit insurance during the 2008 financial crisis, following significant growth in the number of claims, and with insurers foreseeing large losses if they continued to underwrite sales to failing businesses. The Association of British Insurers (ABI) reported that in the first quarter of 2009, the number of trade credit insurance claims rose to 9,213, up from 6,225 in the same period in 2008, an increase of 48%. The value of UK claims incurred in 2008 was £360m, compared to £257m in 2007. The withdrawal of cover led to accusations that the insurers were deepening and prolonging the recession, as businesses could not afford the risk of making sales without the insurance, and therefore contracted in size or had to close. Insurers countered these criticisms by claiming that they were not the cause of the crisis, but were responding to economic reality and ringing the alarm bells. The ABI issued a Statement of Principles on Trade Credit Insurance in April 2009, which set out how trade credit insurers operated and informed clients about the service they could expect. The Statement of Principles included:

- an overview of how risk assessment decisions are made
- the nature of a "fair assessment of risk", the type of information insurers needed to complete a risk assessment, and the requirement for transparency about customers' financial positions
- a commitment to offer reasons for a decision to stop or substantially reduce credit insurance cover, and to swiftly resolve appeals against decisions, and
- a commitment to work with banks and companies to maximise the potential for UK companies to continue to trade.

In 2009, the UK government set up a short-term £5 billion Trade Credit Top-up emergency fund. However, this was considered a failure, as the take-up was only £18m. from an available fund of £5 billion.

In 2020 another wave of coverage denials in trade credit insurance, prompted by pandemic-related credit risk uncertainty, threatened trade.

== See also ==
- Export credit agency
- List of insurance topics
- Political risk insurance
