= Allianz Trade =

International insurance company

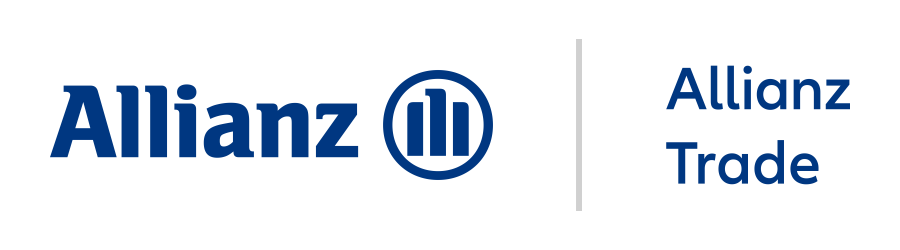

- Type: Société Anonyme
- Industry: insurance
- Founded: 2022 Allianz Trade (Trademark used to designate a range of services provided by Euler Hermes); 2002 Euler Hermes; 1917 Hermes; 1883 ACI
- Defunct: 2003
- Headquarters: Tour Inspire 46 rue Arago, 92800 La Défense Paris, France
- Key people: Aylin Somersan Coqui, chairman of Allianz Trade Board of Management
- Products: Bonding, credit insurance, reinsurance, trade debt collection
- Revenue: € 2,9 billion (2021)
- Number of employees: 5500+ (2021)
- Parent: Allianz
- Divisions: Allianz Trade in Americas; Allianz Trade in Asia-Pacific; Allianz Trade in Germany-Austria-Switzerland; Allianz Trade in France; Allianz Trade in Mediaterranean countries, Solunion
- Website: http://www.allianz-trade.com/

Allianz Trade is an international insurance company that offers a range of services, including trade credit insurance, debt collection, surety bonds and guarantees, business fraud insurance and political risk protection. It monitors the financial health of over 80 million companies.

It is a subsidiary of Allianz SE. It is rated AA by Standard and Poor's.

Headquartered in Paris, the company is present in more than 50 countries with more than 5,500 employees, and has a global market share of 34%. They posted a consolidated turnover of €2.9billion in 2021, and insured global business transactions representing €931billion in exposure.

== History ==
=== Creation of credit insurers around the world ===
- 1883: ACI in the United States
- 1917: Hermes Kreditversicherungsbank in Germany
- 1918: Trade Indemnity in the United Kingdom
- 1927: SFAC in France and SIAC in Italy
- 1929: COBAC in Belgium

=== Birth of Euler Hermes ===
SFAC acquired COBAC in 1993, followed by Trade Indemnity in 1996, and ACI and SIAC in 1998. During the same year, Allianz acquired AGF, a shareholder of SFAC. The holding Compagnie Financière SFAC was renamed Euler.

From 2000, Euler was listed on the Paris Stock Exchange. Two years later in 2002, Euler acquired Hermes, the German market leader in trade credit insurance. In 2003, the Group and all its subsidiaries became Euler Hermes.

Euler Hermes began to expand internationally in 2004, and opened offices in Asia–Pacific, Latin America, and the Middle East (Kuwait, Oman, Qatar, and the United Arab Emirates) between 2004 and 2009. In 2007, Euler Hermes increased its shareholding to 50% in COSEC, the market leader in Portugal. In 2013, Solunion, a joint venture between Euler Hermes and MAPFRE, was created covering Spain and Latin America. In the same year, Euler Hermes increased its shareholding in ICIC, a credit insurer in Israel, to 50%.

=== Joining the Allianz Group ===
In 2018, Allianz completed the acquisition of Euler Hermes's outstanding shares and Euler Hermes Group became fully owned by the Allianz Group. In March 2022, Euler Hermes changed its brand name to Allianz Trade.

== Activities ==
=== Trade credit insurance ===
This is an insurance policy and a risk management product offered to companies to protect their accounts receivables from loss due to credit risk. Should their customers become insolvent or fall into protracted default, it includes indemnification for the values of goods or services delivered. The policy could include a component of political risk insurance, which insures the risk of non-payment by foreign clients due to issues such as currency problems, political unrest and expropriation. Some policies also include debt collection, which is the process of pursuing payment of debts owed by businesses.

=== Surety bonds and guarantees ===
A bond, or financial guarantee, protects the contractual obligations between businesses and a customer, supplier or partner. It is a contractual triangle relationship between the business, the surety bond company or guarantor, and the third-party requiring the bond. The surety bond company or guarantor financially guarantees the third party that the business will abide by the terms established by the bond or guarantee. In the event of non-performance of the specified obligations, the surety bond company or guarantor is there to provide compensation for loss and damage.

== Economic research ==
Ludovic Subran is the Chief Economist of Allianz, and Ana Boata is Director of Economic Research of Allianz Trade. The department's economic research team analyzes and anticipates international economic trends and covers international commerce, macroeconomics, payment risks. The Economic Research Department updates its country risk and sector risk ratings every quarter.

== Board of management ==
- Aylin Somersan Coqui, CEO and chairperson of the Board of Management
- Loeiz Limon-Duparcmeur, Group Chief Financial Officer (CFO), Member of Board of Management in charge of Finance and Tax.
- Anil Berry, Member of Board of Management in charge of Market Management, Commercial and Distribution
- Fabrice Desnos, Member of Board of Management in charge of Credit Intelligence, Reinsurance and Surety
- Michael Eitelwein, Group Chief Operating Officer (COO), Member of Board of Management in charge of Operations and IT
- Florence Lecoutre, Member of Board of Management in charge of Transformation, Human Resources, Communication and Environmental, Social, and Governance.
