= Political risk =

Probability of adverse effects of political decisions

Political risk is a type of risk faced by investors, corporations, and governments that political decisions, events, or conditions will significantly affect the profitability of a business actor or the expected value of a given economic action. Political risk can be understood and managed with reasoned foresight and investment.

The term political risk has had many different meanings over time, but broadly speaking, it refers to the complications which businesses and governments may face as a result of what are commonly referred to as political decisions or trends: "any political change that alters the expected outcome and value of a given economic action by changing the probability of achieving business objectives".

== Types of political risk ==
Political risks faced by businesses can be defined as "the risk of a strategic, financial, or personnel loss for a firm because of such nonmarket factors as macroeconomic and social policies (fiscal, monetary, trade, investment, industrial, income, labour, and developmental), or events related to political instability (terrorism, riots, coups, civil war, and insurrection)." Portfolio investors may face similar financial losses.

Governments may also face complications in their ability to execute diplomatic, military or other initiatives as a result of political risk. The field has historically focused on analyzing political risks predominantly in emerging economies, but such risks also exist in developed economies and liberal democracies as well, albeit in different manifestations. The term is used in the sense of downside risks but political actions or developments can also create upside risks or opportunities for companies and governments.

A low level of political risk in a given country does not necessarily correspond to a high degree of political freedom. Indeed, some of the more stable states are also the most authoritarian. Long-term assessments of political risk must account for the danger that a politically oppressive environment is only stable as long as top-down control is maintained and citizens prevented from a free exchange of ideas and goods with the outside world.

Understanding risk partly as probability and partly as impact provides insight into political risk. For a business, the implication for political risk is that there is a measure of likelihood that political events may complicate its pursuit of earnings through direct impacts (such as taxes or fees) or indirect impacts (such as opportunity cost forgone). As a result, political risk is similar to an expected value such that the likelihood of a political event occurring may reduce the desirability of that investment by reducing its anticipated returns.

There are both macro- and micro-level political risks. Macro-level political risks have similar impacts across all foreign actors in a given location. While these are included in country risk analysis, it would be incorrect to equate macro-level political risk analysis with country risk as country risk only looks at national-level risks and also includes financial and economic risks. Micro-level risks focus on sector, firm, or project specific risk.

Political risk insurance can be taken out to protect again political risk such as inconvertibility of funds, expropriation, and losses due to violent conflict. Claims due to political risk decrease with political constraints and increase with changes of political leadership in the country.

=== Macro-level ===
Macro-level political risk looks at non-project specific risks. Macro political risks affect all participants in a given country. A common misconception is that macro-level political risk only looks at country-level political risk; however, the coupling of local, national, and regional political events often means that events at the local level may have follow-on effects for stakeholders on a macro-level. Other types of risk include government currency actions, regulatory changes, sovereign credit defaults, endemic corruption, war declarations and government composition changes. These events pose both portfolio investment and foreign direct investment risks that can change the overall suitability of a destination for investment. Moreover, these events pose risks that can alter the way a foreign government must conduct its affairs as well. Macro political risks also affect the organizations operating in the nations and the result of macro level political risks are like confiscation, causing the seize of the businesses' property.

Research has shown that macro-level indicators can be quantified and modelled like other types of risk. For example, Eurasia Group produces a political risk index which incorporates four distinct categories of sub-risk into a calculation of macro-level political stability. This Global Political Risk Index can be found in publications like The Economist. Other companies which offer publications on macro-level political risk include Economist Intelligence Unit, DaMina Advisors, iStrategic LLC, IHS Markit, Jane's and The PRS Group, Inc. DaMina Advisors is focused on frontier markets such as Africa. iStrategic LLC is focused on the Middle East and North Africa.

=== Micro-level ===
Micro-level political risks are project-specific risks. In addition to the macro political risks, companies have to pay attention to the industry and relative contribution of their firms to the local economy. An examination of these types of political risks might look at how the local political climate in a given region may affect a business endeavor. Micropolitical risks are more in the favour of local businesses rather than international organizations operating in the nation. This type of risk process includes the project-specific government review Committee on Foreign Investment in the United States (CFIUS), the selection of dangerous local partners with political power, and expropriation/nationalization of projects and assets.

To extend the CFIUS example above, imagine a Chinese company wished to purchase a U.S. weapons component producer. A micro-level political risk report might include a full analysis of the CFIUS regulatory climate as it directly relates to project components and structuring, as well as analysis of congressional climate and public opinion in the United States toward such a deal. This type of analysis can prove crucial in the decision-making process of a company assessing whether to pursue such a deal. For instance, Dubai Ports World suffered significant public relations damage from its attempt to purchase the U.S. port operations of P&O, which might have been avoided with more clear understanding of the US climate at the time.

Political risk is also relevant for government project decision-making, whereby government initiatives (be they diplomatic or military or other) may be complicated as a result of political risk. Whereas political risk for business may involve understanding the host government and how its actions and attitudes can affect a business initiative, government political risk analysis requires a keen understanding of politics and policy that includes both the client government as well as the host government of the activity.

== Geopolitical risk ==
In relation to international politics or geopolitics, a subcategory of political risk is geopolitical risk. In this sense, geopolitical risk consists of possible threats resulting from international competition (or geopolitical competition) between states for natural resources, markets, as well as strategic trade routes (e.g. the 21st Century Maritime Silk Road).

Geopolitical risks such as wars, terrorist acts, military attacks, or diplomatic conflicts around the world are of major concern to business, financial market participants, public media, and policy makers.
