= Political risk insurance =

Insurance that protects investments against losses from political or sovereign actions

Political risk insurance is a type of insurance that can be taken out by businesses, of any size, against political risk—the risk that revolution or other political conditions will result in a loss.

Political risk insurance is available for several different types of political risk, including:

- Political violence, such as revolution, insurrection, civil unrest, terrorism or war;
- Governmental expropriation or confiscation of assets;
- Governmental frustration or repudiation of contracts;
- Wrongful calling of letters of credit or similar on-demand guarantees;
- Business Interruption; and
- Inconvertibility of foreign currency or the inability to repatriate funds.

Political risk insurance can be provided at the international level by an international organisation, for example the Multilateral Investment Guarantee Agency (MIGA), which belongs to the World Bank Group, by states and so-called export credit agencies, or by other public agencies.

Political risk insurance claims can be categorized as inconvertibility of funds, expropriation, and violent conflict. As with any insurance, the precise scope of coverage is governed by the terms of the insurance policy. Providers of political risk insurance include public agencies and private insurance companies.

The underwriting of political risk insurance is a dynamic, growing business. As globalisation increases, there are more corporations doing more business in more places around the world with each passing year. Some of the changes occurring in the business are high growth, new product offerings, and a greater role for private capital.

While political risk insurance policies are sometimes manuscripted for specific situations, the major political risk insurers have standard forms for the coverages that they issue. For "complex" or larger investments manuscripted policies are the norm and there may be several insurers providing cover in the form of a syndication, through co-insurance, or perhaps with the participation of a reinsurer on a facultative basis.

Political risk insurance claims were shown to increase with changes of political leadership in the country and violent conflict and decrease with political constraints.

== See also ==
- war risk insurance – Insurance that covers losses arising from war, terrorism, or other hostile acts
