= Atradius =

Trade credit insurance company

Coordinates: 52°20′27.54″N 4°49′36.35″E

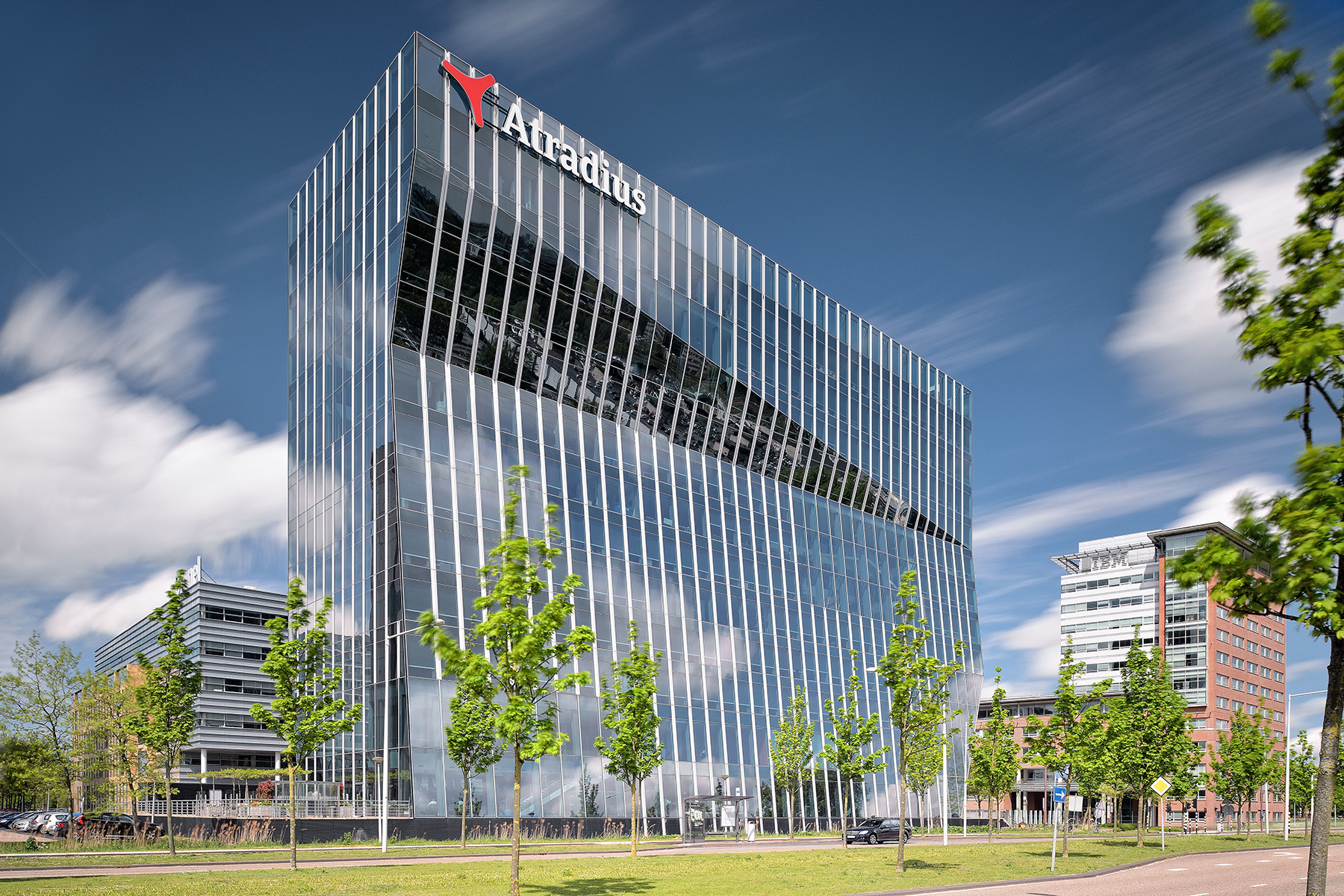
- Atradius headquarters in Amsterdam, The Netherlands
- Type: Trade credit insurer
- Industry: Insurance
- Founded: 1925 Nederlandsche Credietverzekering Maatschappij (NCM), 1929 Crédito y Caución, 1954 Gerling-Konzern Speziale Kreditversicherung, 2001 GERLING NCM
- Headquarters: Amsterdam, Netherlands
- Area served: Europe, Asia, Africa, North America, Oceania, South America
- Key people: David Capdevila, Chief Executive Officer (2020), Andreas Tesch, Claus Gramlich-Eicher, Marc Henstridge, Marta Nodal
- Products: Export Credit Insurance, Bonding, Instalment Credit Protection (ICP), Reinsurance Business, Collections
- Revenue: EUR€ 2.6 billion; (2025)
- Net income: EUR€ 400.1 million (2025)
- Total assets: EUR 5,755.9 million; (2025)
- Owner: Crédito y Caución (64.23%), Grupo Catalana Occidente (35.77%) (2025)
- Number of employees: 3,619
- Divisions: Atradius Crédito y Caución S.A. de Seguros y Reaseguros (ES), Atradius Collections Holding B.V. (NL), Atradius Credit Insurance Agency, Inc (USA), Atradius Insurance Holding N.V. (NL), Atradius Finance B.V. (NL), Atradius Participations Holding B.V. (NL)
- Website: https://group.atradius.com/
- Footnotes; Annual Report 2025 Atradius N.V. https://group.atradius.com/about-us/about-atradius-group

Atradius provides trade credit insurance, surety and collections services worldwide through a presence in more than 50 countries around the globe. It is the credit insurance arm of Grupo Catalana Occidente (GCO.MC). Credit insurance, bonding and collections products help protect companies throughout the world from payment risks associated with selling products and services on trade credit. In 2025 the company had revenues of EUR 2.6 billion. The company is rated ‘A (excellent) stable outlook’ by AM Best and 'A1, outlook stable’ by Moody's.

== History ==
The roots of Atradius can be found in the 2001 acquisition by German insurer Gerling-Konzern Speziale Kreditversicherung (Gerling Credit) of Dutch insurer Nederlandsche Credietverzekering Maatschappij (NCM). The company was then branded as GERLING NCM.

Gerling Credit was established in 1954 as the credit insurance arm of the Gerling-Konzern insurance group of Cologne. In 1962 it opened its first international branch office in Switzerland and was the first private credit insurer to offer export credit protection.

NCM had been founded in 1925 with the goal of improving trade for companies in the Netherlands. From 1932 onwards it also became the arm of the Dutch government through which it provided export credit services to Dutch companies. Atradius still performs this function through its affiliate Atradius Dutch State Business.

Both Gerling Credit and NCM had made their own acquisitions before their combination, including the acquisition by NCM of the short-term arm of the UK government's Export Credit Guarantee Department (ECGD) in 1991 and private insurers such as Namur Assurances du Crédit S.A., Belgium by Gerling Credit in 1994, both of which have their own histories dating back to the birth of trade credit insurance around 1919.

The now international group was renamed Atradius in 2004. In 2008 the group merged with the Spanish credit insurer Crédito y Caución, founded in 1929, and subsequently gained an additional foothold in the Spanish speaking world.

Atradius forms part of Grupo Catalana Occidente (GCO.MC), one of the leading insurers in Spain and worldwide in credit insurance.

The Atradius Group today is the amalgamation of a number of international trade credit insurers and affiliated organisations from around the world.

Although now Spanish owned, the holding company Atradius N.V. and its headquarters remain in Amsterdam, the Netherlands.

== Products ==
Atradius products and services help manage the payment default risks - the risk that a buyer fails to pay for the products or services it buys on trade credit terms.

These products include:

- Trade Credit Insurance
- Surety
- Instalment Credit Protection;
- Reinsurance
- Collections

== Shareholders ==
(Spain) Grupo Compañía Española de Crédito y Caución, S.L. (Grupo CyC) is a holding company owned 73.84% by Grupo Catalana Occidente S.A. Grupo CyC holds 64.23% of Atradius N.V.

(Spain) Grupo Catalana Occidente S.A. (GCO) is, either directly or indirectly, the parent company of a group of insurance companies.

GCO has an economic stake in Atradius N.V. of 83.20%, of which 35.77% is directly owned and 47.43% is owned indirectly through Grupo CyC holding company.

== Management ==
Atradius N.V. is a limited company organised under the laws of the Netherlands with a management board and a Supervisory board.

The management board consists of:

- David Capdevila, chief executive officer. As CEO, he is responsible for the units Strategy and Corporate Development, Human Resources and Facilities, Legal and Compliance, Internal Audit, IT Services, and Group Marketing & Communication.
- Andreas Tesch, Chief Risk Officer (CRO). He is responsible for the units Group Buyer Underwriting, Risk Services, and Atradius Dutch State Business.
- Claus Gramlich-Eicher, Chief Financial Officer. As CFO he is responsible for Finance, Financial Control, Corporate Finance, and Enterprise Risk Management.
- Marc Henstridge, Chief Market Officer (CMO). He is responsible for Atradius Credit Insurance in US, Mexico, Canada, Asia, Oceania, UK, Ireland. He is also responsible for Atradius Global, Credit Specialties and Atradius Re.
- Marta Nodal, Chief Market Officer (CMO). As CMO she is responsible for Atradius Credit Insurance in Spain, Portugal, Brazil, Germany, Central and Eastern Europe, Netherlands, Nordics, France, Belgium, Luxembourg, Italy. She is also responsible for Atradius Collections, Surety, Instalment Credit Protection, and Group Claims and Recoveries.

The supervisory board has nine members and is responsible for monitoring and guiding the general affairs of Atradius and the policy of the management board.

The supervisory board includes:

- Xavier Freixes (chair)
- Hugo Serra
- Désirée van Gorp
- Carlos Halpern
- José María Sunyer
- Juan Ignacio Guerrero
- Joaquín Guallar
- Isabel Gómez
- Daphne de Kluis

== See also ==
- Trade Credit Insurance
- Collections
