= Berne Union =

- Type: International Trade Association
- Industry: Insurance
- Founded: 1934; 92 years ago, in Bern, Switzerland
- Headquarters: London, United Kingdom
- Key people: Maëlia Dufour, President; Benjamin Mugisha, Vice-President; Paul Heaney, Secretary General
- Website: www.berneunion.org

The Berne Union, also known as The International Union of Credit & Investment Insurers, is an international non-profit association and community for the global export credit and investment insurance industry.

The association provides a forum for professional exchange among members, as well as promoting constructive engagement in collaborative projects with external stakeholders from across the wider trade finance industry, including banks and financiers, regulators and policy setters, traders, academics and other associations. Its mission is to actively facilitate cross-border trade by supporting international acceptance of sound principles in export credit and foreign investment.

== Membership ==
As of January 2023, the Berne Union represents 86 member companies from 67 countries worldwide. These include government-backed official export credit agencies, private credit and political risk insurers and multilateral institutions. In 2021, Berne Union members collectively provided payment risk protection to banks, exporters and investors amounting to US$2.7 trillion. This total business volume represents cover of approximately 13% of total world cross border trade for goods and services, as recorded by WTO figures.

== History ==
The Berne Union was founded in 1934 by private and state export credit insurers from France, Italy, Spain and the UK. These insurers sought to exchange trade information in order to collectively reduce commercial risks. The first meeting was held in Berne, Switzerland – which is where the name Berne Union comes from. While Berne is still the legal domicile of the Union, it has not met there since 1939.

Notable milestones include:

- An expanded mandate in 1974, to include members who insure foreign investments
- Creation of the 'Prague Club' in 1993, designed to support new and maturing export credit agencies and insurers setting up and developing export credit and investment insurance schemes
- In 1999, the export credit members formed two committees, focusing on short term and medium/long term export credit business

As of 2017, the modern Berne Union is structured around four committees, representing these two export credit groups (short term and medium/long term) along with an investment insurance committee and the so-called Prague Club Committee (PC), which was formally integrated in May 2016, having been a legally separate, but closely associated entity prior to this.

== Governance ==
The Berne Union is led by the President, Vice President and a Management Committee, with each elected position held for a term of two years. The Management Committee are supported by a permanent Secretariat, led by the Secretary General and based in London, in the United Kingdom.

The Current President is Ms Maëlia Dufour, Director of International Relations, Business Development, Rating, Environment and Climate BPIFRANCE - France's Export Credit Agency. Current Vice President, Mr Benjamin Mugisha, Chief Underwriting Officer of Multilateral Insurer African Trade Insurance. Both were elected in November 2022, for a term of two years.

Mr Paul Heaney was appointed Secretary General of the Berne Union in May 2023.

== Activities ==
Members of the Berne Union meet twice per year for the Spring General Meeting (in April/May) and the Annual General Meeting (in October / November). Throughout the year a further 5-6 meetings take place on specialist topics such as: claims and recoveries, country risk, project finance, reinsurance, data reporting etc.
