= Dai (surname) =

Dai (戴)
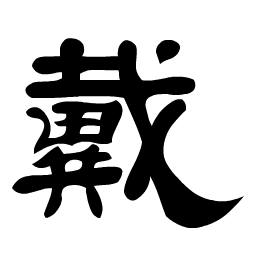
- Romanization: Mandarin: Dai, Tai
- Pronunciation: Dài (Mandarin)
- Language: Chinese

Dai is the pinyin romanization of the Chinese surname written with the Chinese character 戴. It is romanized as Tai in Wade-Giles and in Hong Kong Government Cantonese Romanisation. Dai is the 96th most common surname in China, according to a report on the household registrations released by the Chinese Ministry of Public Security on April 24, 2007.

== Meanings of the character ==
- Apply items to the person's head, face, neck, hand, etc.
- Respect, esteem, or support.

== Notable people ==
=== Business ===
- Dai Chunning (戴春宁, born 1962), Chinese finance businessman
- Dai Min (戴敏, born 1958), Chinese water treatment businesswoman
- Weili Dai (戴伟立), Chinese-born American technology businesswoman
- Andrew Tai (戴浩原), Canadian-Chinese businessman, Founder & CEO of Unhaggle and Motoinsight

=== Academia and literature ===
- Chen-To Tai (1915—2004), Chinese-born American engineer
- Dai Yi (戴逸, 1926–2024), Chinese historian
- Dai Qing (戴晴, born 1941), Chinese journalist
- Dai Sijie (戴思杰, born 1954), Chinese-born French author and filmmaker
- Dai Jinhua (戴锦华, born 1959), Chinese feminist cultural critic
- Dai Xu (戴旭, born 1964), Chinese author, social commentator, and the president of Marine Institute For Security And Cooperation
- Hongjie Dai (戴宏杰, born 1966), Chinese-born American chemist

=== Entertainment ===
- Aaron Dai (戴海清, born 1967), American composer and pianist
- Emily Dai, born Dai Ying (Chinese: 戴莹; pinyin: Dài Yíng), a Chinese television producer and media executive
- Leon Dai (戴立忍, born 1966), Taiwanese actor and film director
- Penny Tai (戴佩妮, born 1978), Malaysian Mandopop singer
- Dai Jiaoqian (戴娇倩, born 1982), Chinese actress
- Dai Luwa (代露娃, born 1997), Chinese actress
- Dantes Dailiang (戴亮, born 1978), French Mandopop singer

=== Politics and government ===
- Dai Jitao (戴季陶, 1891–1949), journalist and Kuomintang leader
- Dai Li (戴笠, 1897–1946), Republic of China spy chief
- Dai Bingguo (戴秉国, born 1941), Chinese politician and diplomat
- Dai Xianglong (戴相龙, born 1944), Chinese politician, former governor of the People's Bank of China
- Tai Chin-wah (戴展華, born 1952), Hong Kong former politician and lawyer
- Benny Tai (戴耀廷), Hong Kong legal scholar, political figure and democracy activist, co-founder of Occupy Central
- Dai Weimin (戴维民, born 1962), People's Liberation Army general
- Day Guey-ing (戴桂英), Deputy Minister of Department of Health of the Republic of China (2012–2013)
- Irving H.C. Tai (戴豪君), Taiwanese politician, former Deputy Commissioner of the Research, Development and Evaluation Commission
- Tai Cheuk-yin (戴卓賢), Hong Kong politician, former chairman of the 123 Democratic Alliance
- Katherine Tai (戴琪, born 1974), United States Trade Representative (2021–2025)

=== Sport ===
- Tai Chao-chih (戴兆智, born 1930), Taiwanese sport shooter
- Dai Guohong (戴国红, born 1977), Chinese swimmer
- Dai Yun (戴韫, born 1977), retired Chinese female badminton player
- Dai Xianrong (戴宪荣, born 1982), China League One footballer
- Dai Lili (戴丽丽, born 1986), Chinese table tennis player
- Dai Lin (戴琳, born 1987), Chinese Super League footballer
- Tai Hung-hsu (戴宏旭, born 1987), Taiwanese football striker
- Dai Xiaoxiang (戴小祥, born 1990), Chinese archer
- Dai Jun (swimmer) (戴骏, born 1992), Chinese swimmer
- Tai Tzu-ying (戴資穎, born 1992), Taiwanese badminton player
- Olivia Tai Qing Tong (戴辛彤, born c. 1998), Malaysian rhythmic gymnast

=== Other ===
- Wei Dai (戴维), creator of the Bitcoin predecessor "b-money" and developer of the Crypto++ library

== See also ==
- Yūki Tai, of unrelated Japanese surname Tai
