= Bengt Gustaf Olsson =

Swedish inventor and entrepreneur

Bengt G. Olsson
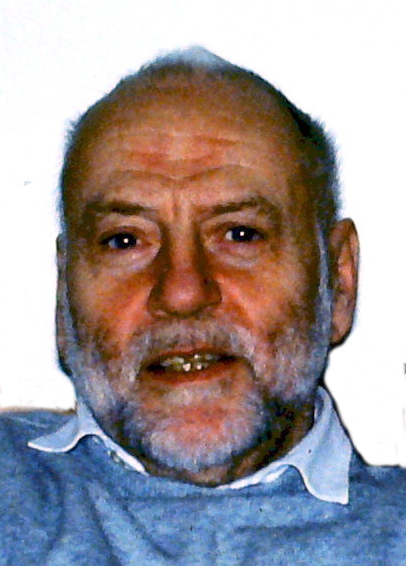
- Born: May 6, 1924; Steneby parish, Dalsland, Sweden
- Died: April 15, 2015 (aged 90); Nacka, Sweden
- Education: Chalmers University of Technology
- Occupations: Inventor and entrepreneur

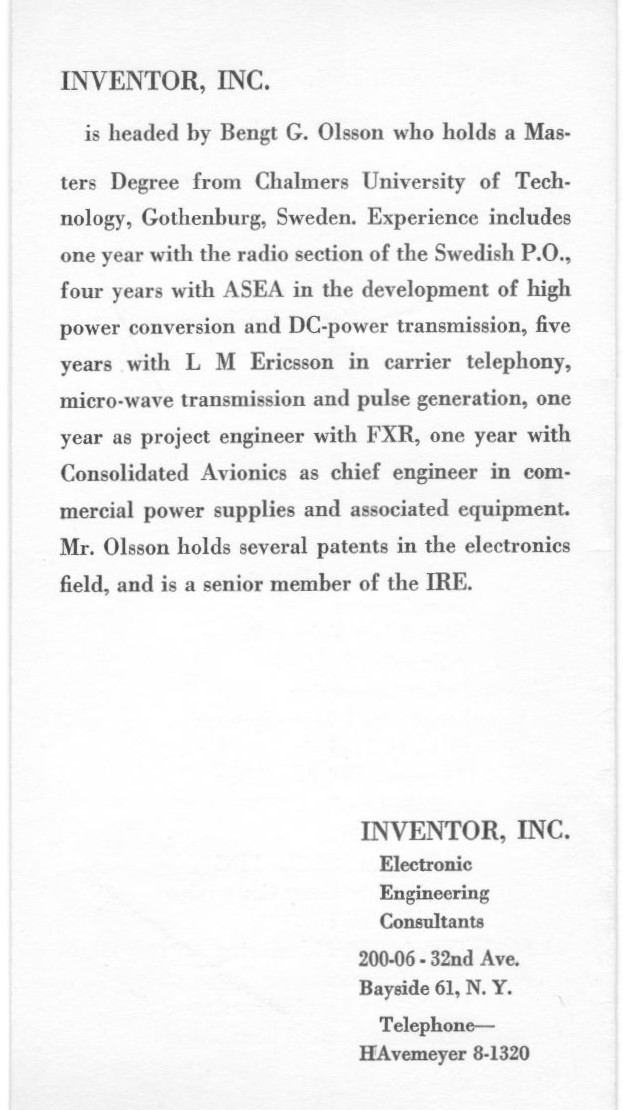
Backside of a brochure for Bengt G. Olssons consultancy company "Inventor, Inc.", which was active in New York in the beginning of the 1960s

Bengt Gustaf Olsson (May 6, 1924, in the parish of Steneby in Dalsland, Sweden – April 4, 2015, in Stockholm, Sweden) was a Swedish inventor and entrepreneur. He was active both in Sweden as well as in the United States as an electrical engineer within the field of analog electronics. He also founded the Swedish electronics company Xelex AB that provided electronic equipment for professional use as well as HiFi equipment for personal use.

== Biography ==
Bengt G. Olsson was born and raised outside the small village of Dals Långed in the landscape of Dalsland that constitutes a rural part of western Sweden. His parents were Martin Olsson, descendant from Blekinge and a teacher of an elementary school, and his wife Ester, born Löfgren and descendant from Småland. He studied electrical engineering and electronics at the Chalmers University of Technology in Gothenburg and took his Master of Science degree in 1949. During the 1950s he divided his time mainly between the two large Swedish companies ASEA (now part of ABB) and LM Ericsson, before moving to New York, USA in 1959. In New York he worked in various engineering positions within microwave technology, power supply and space electronics. He also had his own consultancy business under the profound name "Inventor, Inc.".

After moving back to Sweden in 1964 he founded the company "Xelex AB" that during almost three decades supplied electronic products, mainly for the B2B segment but also in less extent to private persons. Bengt G. Olsson have a number of patents within such different areas as wire recorders, transistor amplifiers, heat regulation, to sailing ships. Within amplifier theory, he was advocating negative feedback as an important mechanism for linearity of amplifiers, and provided many innovative new solutions (for example ). He also debated the nature of Transient Intermodulation Distorsion (TIM), which was a controversial subject at the time, in an important contribution (Note: Private communication with Walt Jung, 2016-01-06, "For whatever it may be worth, that paper may be one of the most cogent ever on this topic. Your father was truly a gifted engineer, and a brilliant man indeed.") to Audio Engineering Society (AES) 56th convent in Paris 1977.

After having divested his company, Olsson continued within the electronics field on a consultancy basis. In Sweden he is well known within the electronics community for his series of articles, called "Olsson's tips" that were written in an educative and personal style, in the electronics branch media "Modern Elektronik" and "Elektronik i Norden". He also wrote several articles for the international Electronics World + Wireless World magazine. During his last productive years he spent much time on his own theory about the origination of the universe that he termed the "Slow Start universe" (compare "Big Bang"). His main argument was that the Slow Start theory explains the spectral redshift, that according to the Big Bang theory is caused by an expanding universe, in a simpler manner by instead assuming that time itself slowly accelerates.

Bengt G. Olsson was in 1960 admitted as a senior member of the Institute of Radio Engineers (later IEEE).

== Xelex AB ==
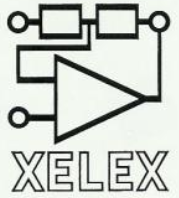
Xelex AB logotype, showing a stylized operational amplifier.

"Ingenjörsfirman Xelex AB" ("Engineering firm Xelex Inc") was founded 1964 by Bengt G. Olsson, who also was the technical lead of the company. Xelex had its premises at various places in the southern Stockholm area during the 1960s, 1970s and 1980s. Early products were related to measurement equipment. Later the products were either standard products or customized products for larger customers. Among the standard products were operational amplifiers, stabilized rectifiers and DC/DC converters. The other large group of products were equipment for audio production and distribution, from pre- and power-amplifiers to audio mixers and complete PA systems. A famous product was the DD-10 power amplifier that could be found in many audio locations. Their products had a reputation for durability and in one of Xelex brochures from the 1970s they used a slogan "If you drop a Xelex amplifier on the floor, it is probably the floor that will be damaged". Among the customers for audio equipment were the national broadcasters Sveriges Radio and Norsk rikskrinkasting.

Xelex AB was acquired in 1985 by Datatronic AB and Olsson stayed for a short time as a consultant. The name was changed to "Xelex Elektronik AB" and the focus of the company changed into developing and manufacture among other things, cost effective satellite receivers for home users. After Datatronics acquisition of Victor Technology, also handheld computers were manufactured. Xelex were also responsible for the manufacturing of Victor's M-series computer. Tandy Corporation acquired Victor in 1989 and Xelex ceased to operate in 1990. The name "Xelex" has later been used by the Swedish chip manufacturer Xelerated but their activity has nothing to do with the original Xelex.

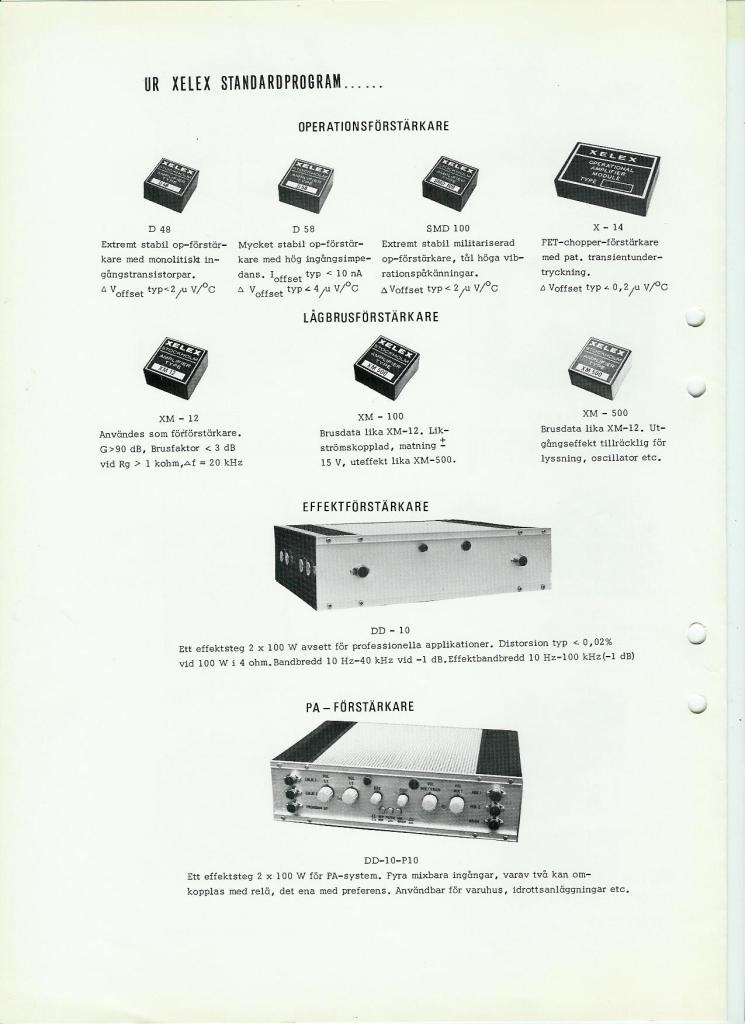
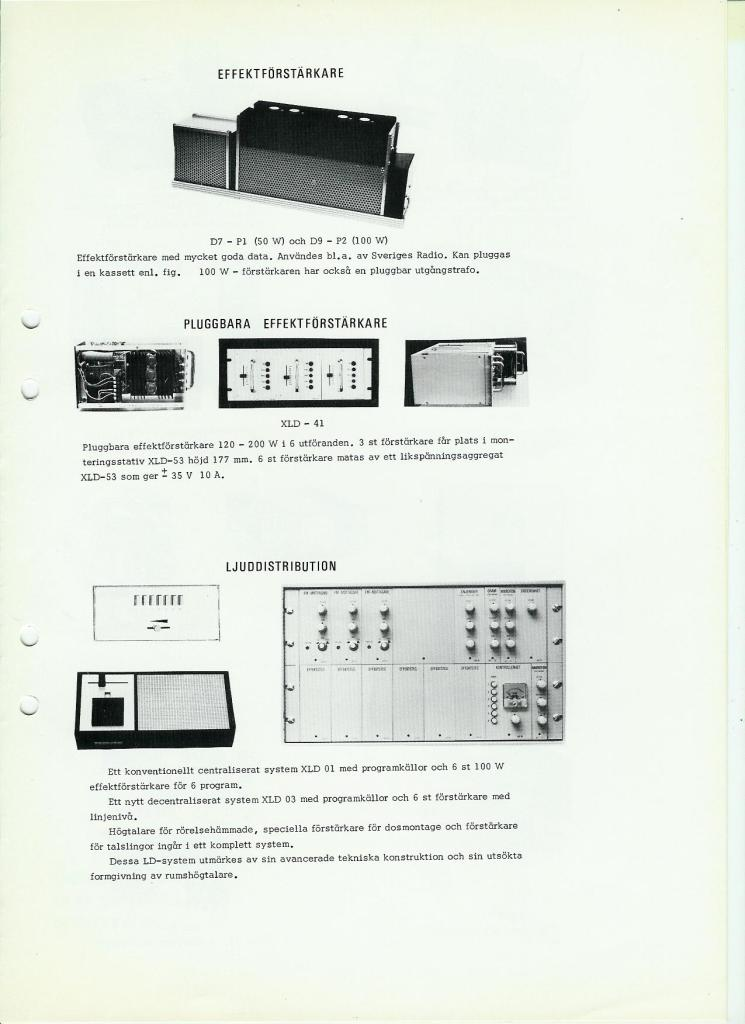
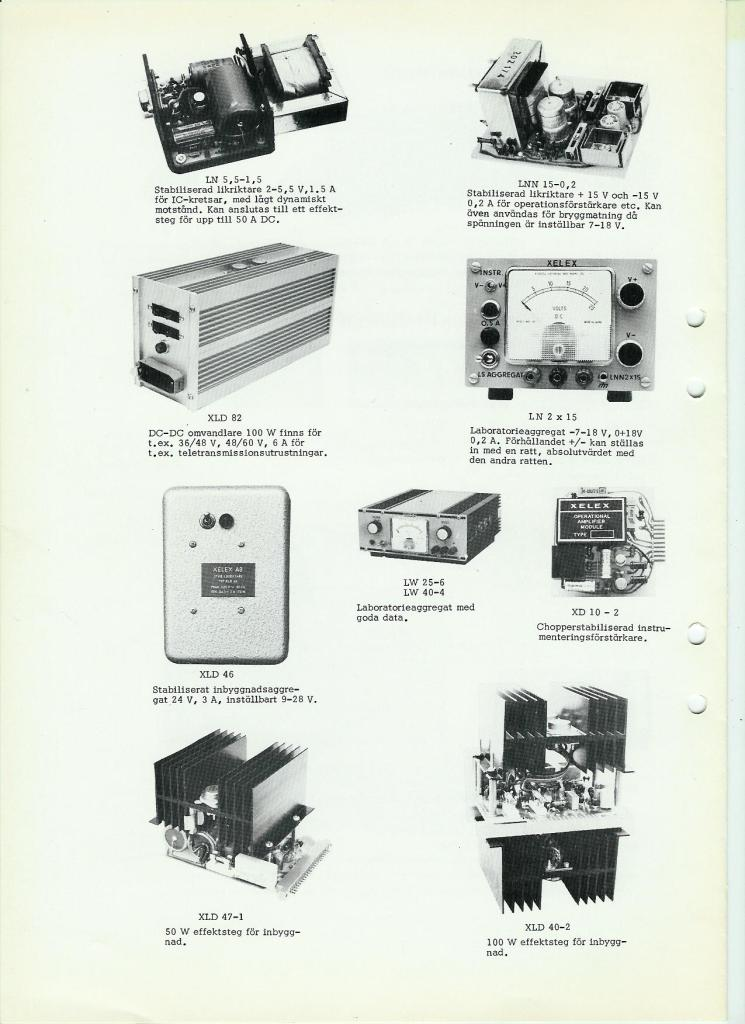
Standard products from Xelex product range
