= Walter Jung =

Walter Jung may refer to:

- Walt Jung, American electronics engineer and author
- Walter Jung (Gauleiter), German Nazi Party official and newspaper editor
