= Linda Milor =

American electrical engineer

Linda Susan Milor is an American electrical engineer specializing in the design, manufacture, testing, and yield of integrated circuits. She is a professor of electrical and computer engineering at Georgia Tech.

== Education and career ==
Milor was a student of electrical engineering at the University of California, Berkeley, both as an undergraduate and as a graduate student. She completed her Ph.D. there in 1992. Her dissertation, on testing circuits with a mix of analog and digital components, was Fault-Driven Analog Testing, and was supervised by Alberto Sangiovanni-Vincentelli.

She became an assistant professor of electrical engineering at the University of Maryland, College Park from 1990 to 1995, but left academia to work in industry, at Advanced Micro Devices from 1995 to 2000, and then briefly as a vice president at eSilicon in 2000. In 2001 she joined Georgia Tech as an associate professor of electrical and computer engineering. She was promoted to full professor in 2012.

== Recognition ==
Milor was named as an IEEE Fellow in 2023, "for contributions to testing of analog circuits and bridging the design-manufacturing gap for integrated circuits (ICs)".
