= Old Daigong Temple =

Taoist temple in Changsha, China

- 老戴公庙
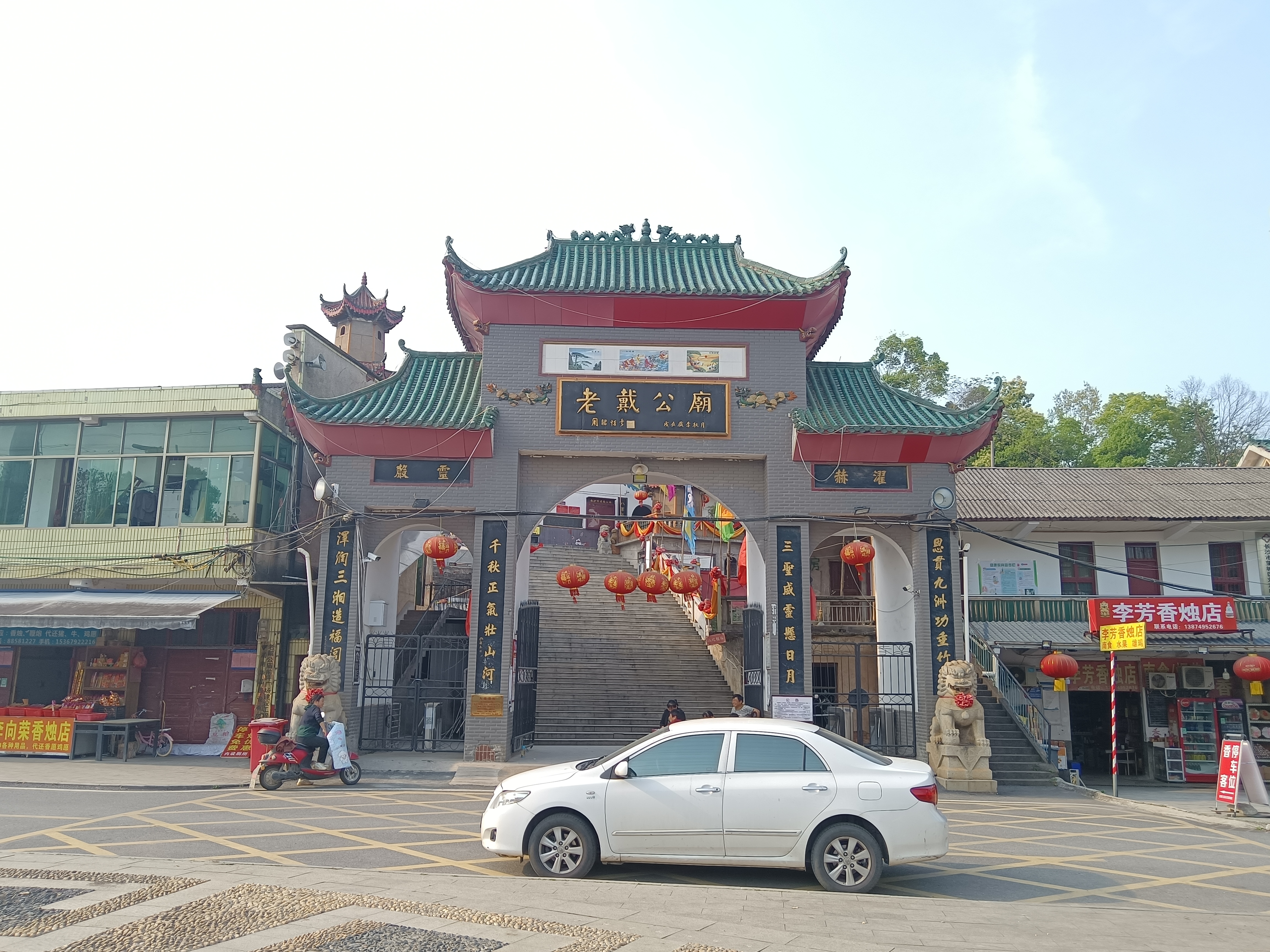
- Mount Gate

- Location within Hunan

Religion
- Affiliation: Taoism
- Deity: Three Dai Brothers

Location
- Location: Wangcheng District of Changsha, Hunan, China
- Coordinates: 27°17′04.08″N 112°53′08.67″E

Architecture
- Style: Chinese architecture
- Established: Tang dynasty (618–907)
- Completed: 2011 (restoration)

Old Daigong Temple (simplified Chinese: 老戴公庙; traditional Chinese: 老戴公廟; pinyin: Lǎo Dài Gōng Miào; lit. 'Old Temple of Venerable Dai') is a Taoist temple located in Wangcheng District of Changsha, Hunan, China.

== Etymology ==
The name 老戴公庙; 老戴公廟; Lǎo Dài Gōng Miào derives from: 老; Lǎo means "old", denoting the temple's historical antiquity and its status as the original site among later branches. "Dai" is a common Chinese surname, and "公; gōng", an honorific title meaning "venerable", "lord" or "revered elder".

== History ==
The temple was initially built during the Tang dynasty (618–907) in honor of the Three Dai Brothers—Zongde (戴宗德; Dài Zōngdé), Zongren (戴宗仁; Dài Zōngrén), and Zongyi (戴宗义; 戴宗義; Dài Zōngyì)—collectively known as the "Three Sages of Dai" (戴公三圣; 戴公三聖; Dài Gōng Sān Shèng). These brothers were celebrated for their martial prowess, medical skills, and heroic deeds, such as rescuing 55 people from shipwrecks in Dongting Lake.

The temple was expanded during the Qing dynasty (1644–1911) and officially renamed "Old Daigong Temple" in 1919 to distinguish it from newer branches.

During the Cultural Revolution, the temple was completely destroyed by the Red Guards. It underwent restorations in 1988 and 2011, preserving its traditional architecture.

== Architecture ==
Now the existing main buildings include Mount Gate, Main Hall, Bell Tower, Drum Tower.

The Main Hall houses statues of the Dai Brothers, revered as Daoist immortals for their divine interventions, such as ending droughts and healing the sick.

== Cultural Relics ==
Tombs of the Three Sages: the temple grounds contain burial mounds dedicated to the Dai brothers, which have been pilgrimage sites for centuries.

== Gallery ==
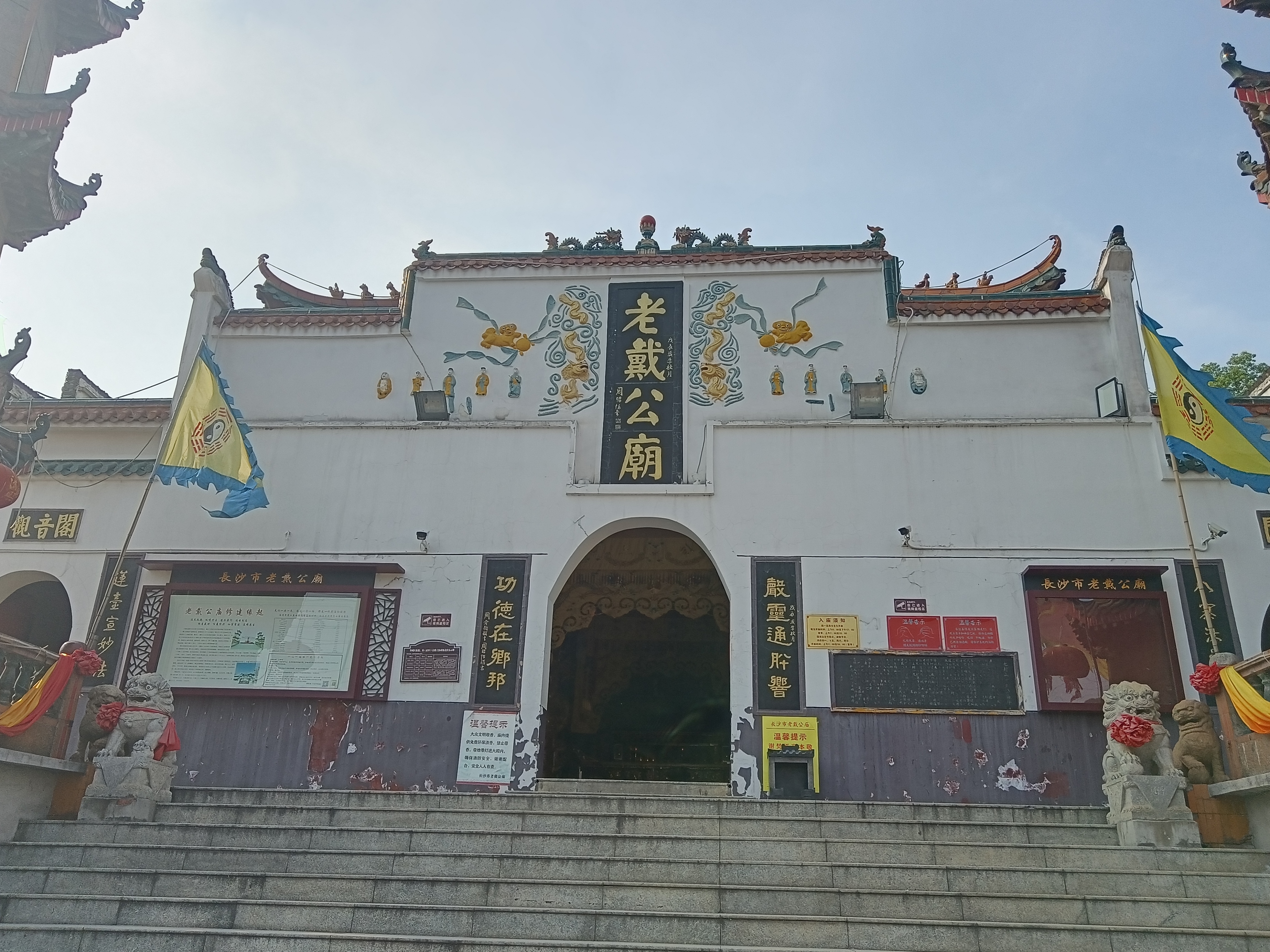
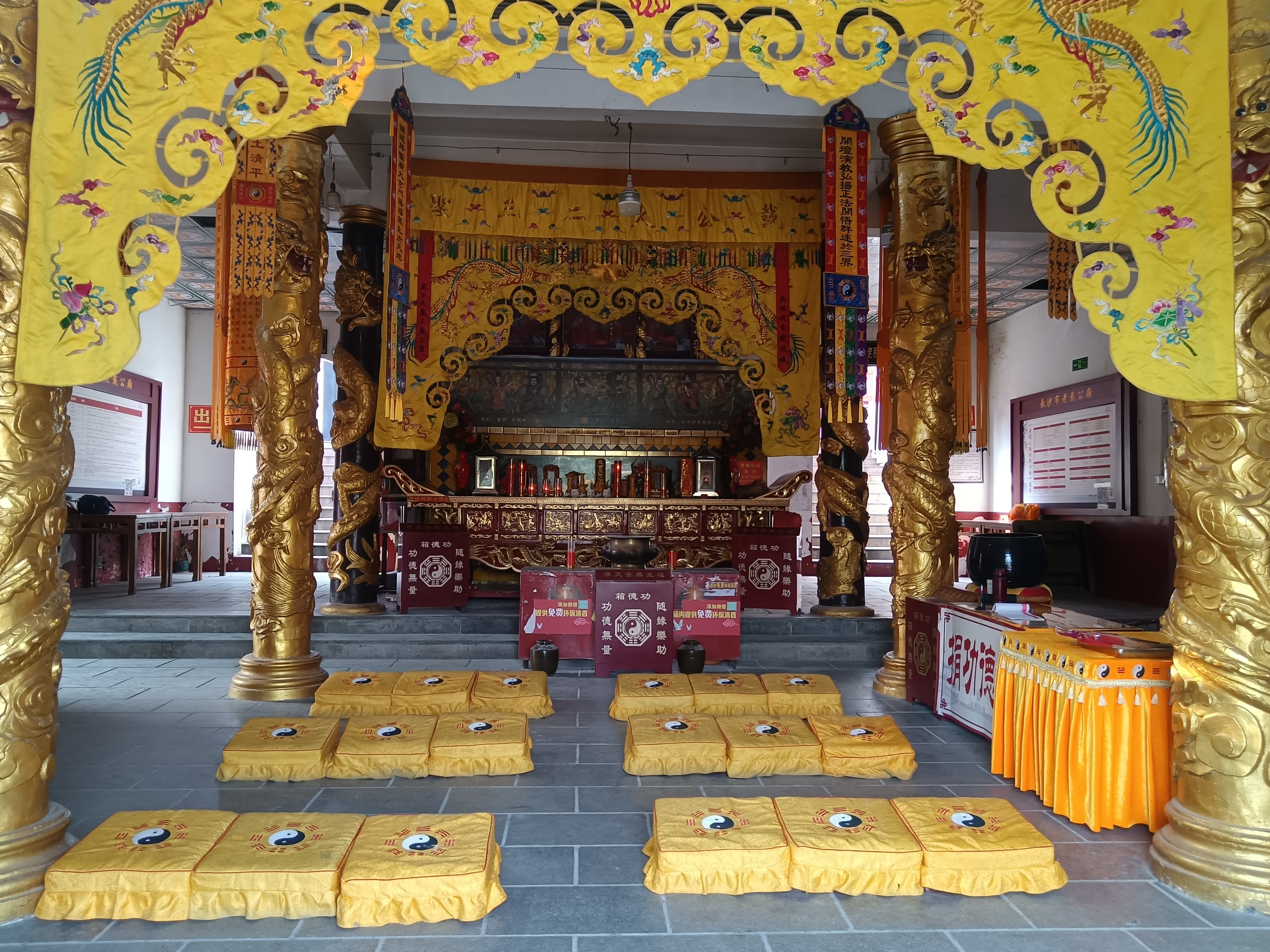
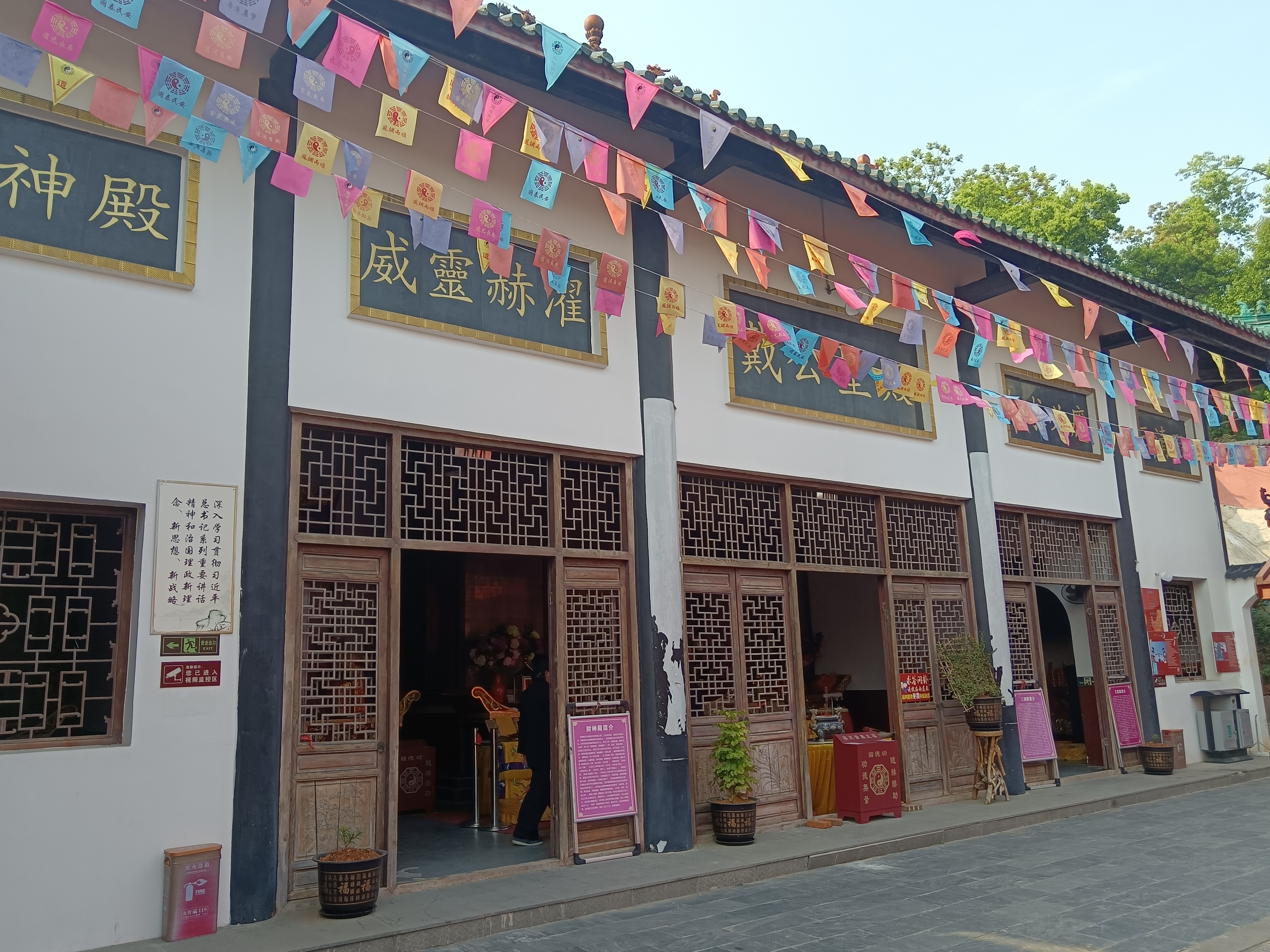

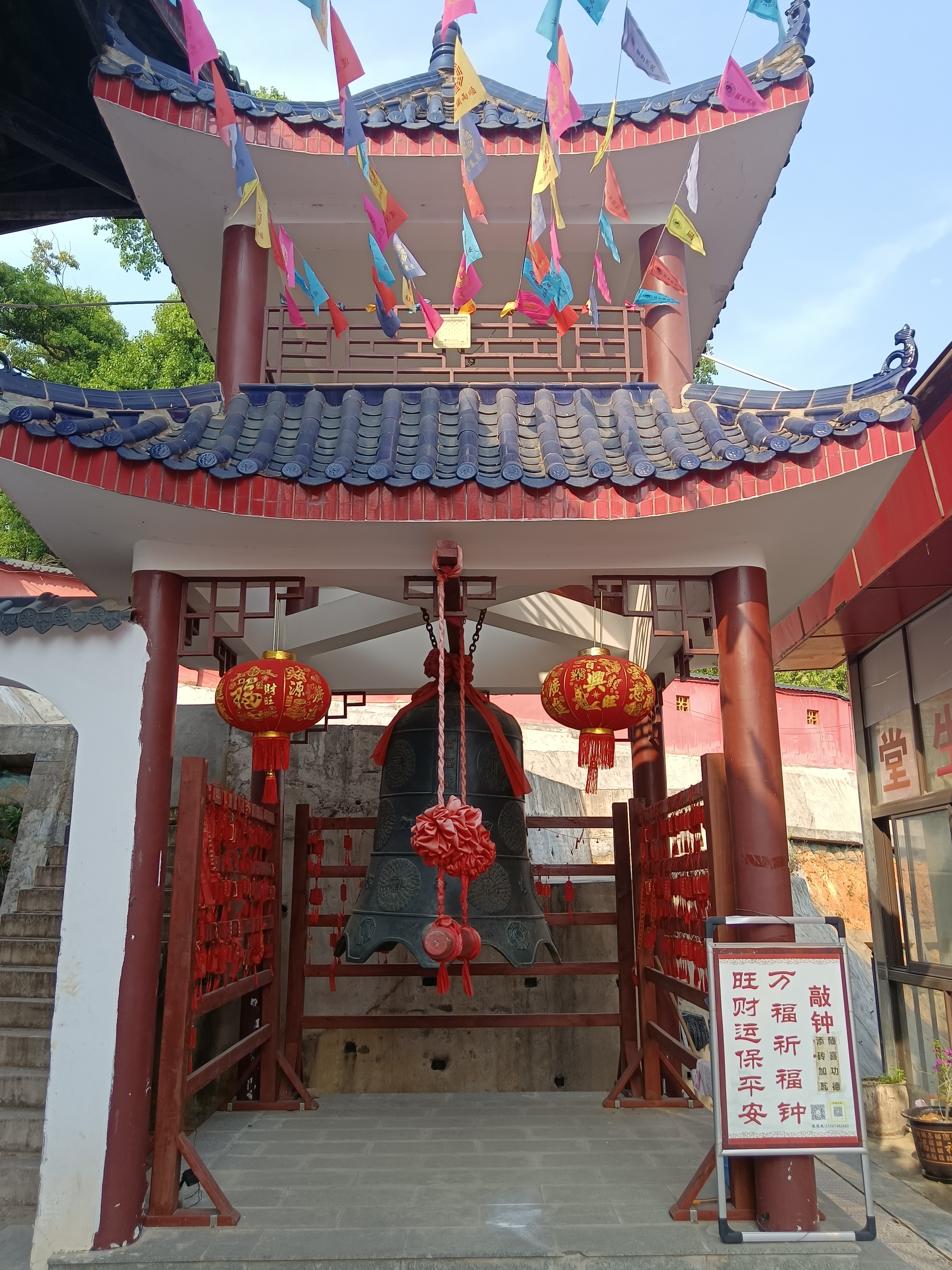
Bell Tower

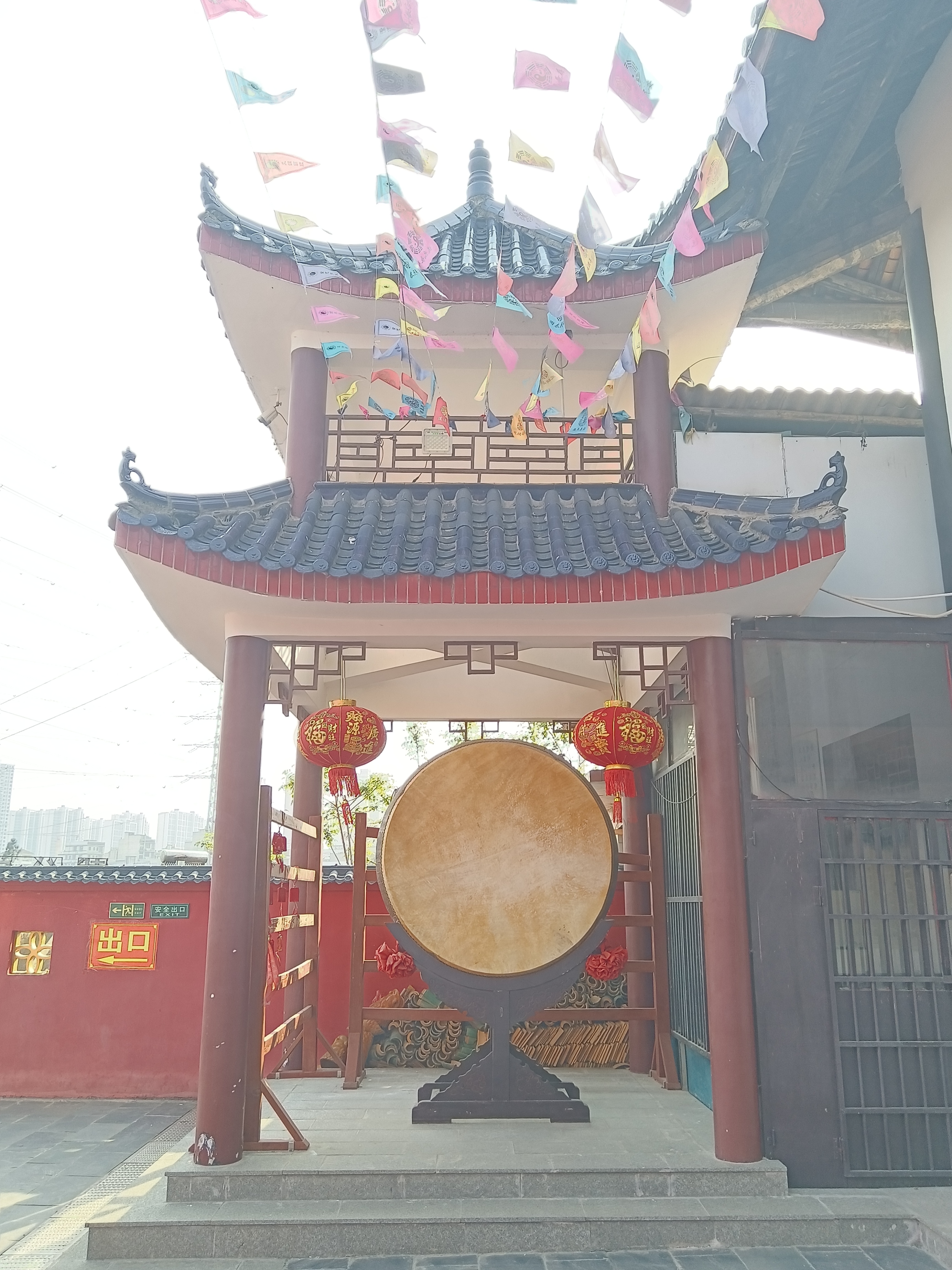
Drum Tower

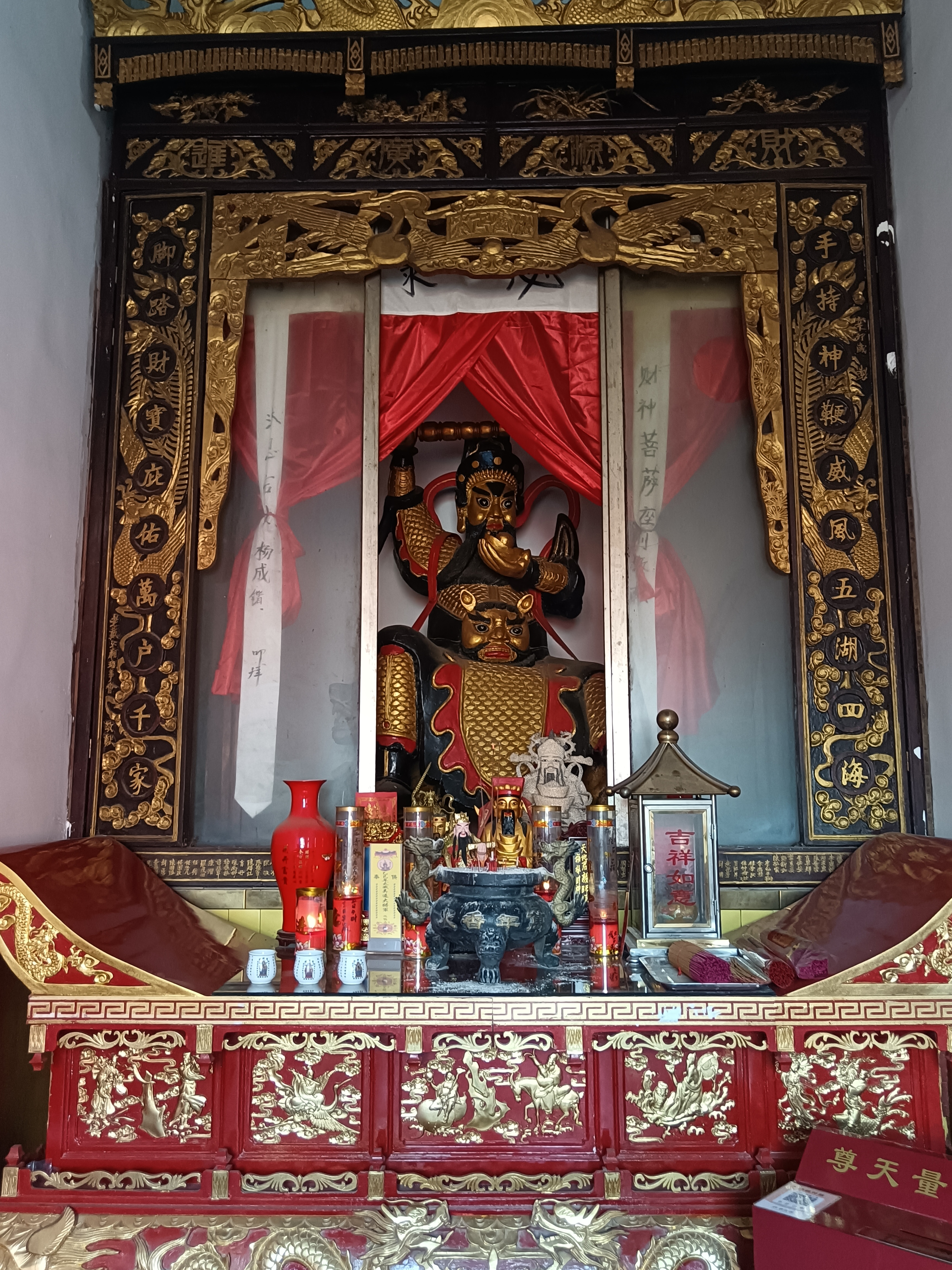
God of Wealth
