= Cortina Systems =

Cortina Systems, Inc. was a supplier of integrated circuits (ICs) for broadband communications founded by Iranian-American entrepreneur Amir Nayyerhabibi in 2001. It was based in California.

Cortina Systems was bought by Inphi Corporation in 2014, which in turn got acquired by Marvell in 2021.

== History ==
Cortina Systems was founded by Amir Nayyerhabibi (who served as president and CEO) in 2001 in the Menlo Park, California library, located in Silicon Valley. It has development centers in USA, Canada, China, Taiwan, Israel.

Cortina’s product line spans computer and telecommunication networking: the company has products for core, enterprise, metropolitan high-speed networks, as well as products for the digital home networks. Products include:

- Ethernet: 1-, 2-, and 4-port 10 Gbit/s Ethernet MACs; 4-, 10-, 12-, and 24-port 1 Gbit/s Ethernet MACs
- Transport: 2.5 Gbit/s, 10 Gbit/s and 40 Gbit/s FEC/OTN Framers; 100 Gbit/s FEC/OTN/Ethernet Framer; 2.5G and 10 Gbit/s VCAT framer
- Framer: SONET/SDH POS, ATM, and GFP framer for OC-3 to OC-192 with integrated SerDes; RPR framer, RPR bridge
- Access: 4-port EPON OLT, EPON ONU
- PHY: 10 Mbit/s transceiver; 1-, 2-, 4-, and 8-port Fast Ethernet transceivers: 6- and 8-port Fast Ethernet repeaters
- T1/E1: 1-, 4-, and 8-port T1/E1/J1 transceivers and repeaters; OC3 transceiver
- Digital Home Processor: Multi-core, Storage, Security

In 2006 it announced the Interlaken protocol with Cisco Systems.

== Manufacturing ==
Cortina was a fabless semiconductor company. It outsourced all semiconductor manufacturing to merchant foundries. The company was based in Sunnyvale, California. It also had other research and development sites in Hsinchu (Taiwan), Ottawa (Canada), Raleigh (USA) and Shanghai (China).

== Acquisitions ==
Cortina acquired several companies. In October 2014 Cortina was acquired by Inphi Corporation, with the exception of Cortina’s Access and Digital Home business.

Date	Acquired Company	Expertise
2004	Azanda Network Devices	Traffic management and ATM Segmentation and Reassembly products
2006	Intel Optical Networking – Component Division	Ethernet Framers, Ethernet PHYs, Optical Transport FEC framers, Ethernet over SONET service framers, and T1/E1 Line Interface Units
2007	Immenstar	Passive optical networking system-on-chip technology
2008	Storm Semiconductor	Network processors for the home
