= Emily Dai =

Chinese television producer and media executive

Dai Ying
- 戴莹
- Other name: Emily Dai
- Occupations: Television producer, media executive
- Years active: 2010s–present
- Employer: iQIYI
- Title: Senior Vice President of iQIYI

Dai Ying (Chinese: 戴莹; pinyin: Dài Yíng), also known as Emily Dai, is a Chinese television producer and media executive. She is a senior vice president of the streaming platform iQIYI and has overseen the development and production of a number of its original television and streaming series.

== Career ==
Dai Ying entered the film and television industry around 2002. She began developing online dramas at iQIYI during the 2010s. Her early producing work included Evil Minds, With You, Burning Ice and The Thunder. She later became closely associated with iQIYI's suspense productions. Following Burning Ice, her team developed adaptations of additional novels by Zijin Chen, including The Bad Kids and The Long Night.

In 2020, Dai served as chief producer of iQIYI's "迷雾剧场" (Light On), whose first slate included Kidnapping Game, The Bad Kids, Crimson River, Sisyphus and The Long Night. She subsequently worked as a chief producer on series including The Knockout, Wild Bloom and The Lonely Warrior. In a 2024 interview, The Beijing News described her as a senior vice president of iQIYI.

Dai received the Best Creative award for The Bad Kids at the 2020 Asia Contents Awards, held as part of the Busan International Film Festival.

== Production credits ==
Year	Productions
2013	With You, Memory Lost, Burning Ice, Legend of Yunxi, Original Sin, The Thunder, Bureau of Transformer, The Listener, Sword Dynasty
2015	The Lost Tomb, Evil Minds
2017	My Huckleberry Friends
2018	Tang Dynasty Tour, The Legend of White Snake
2019	Waiting for You in the Future
2020	Kidnapping Game, The Bad Kids, Crimson River, Sisyphus, The Long Night, Ideal City, Legal Mavericks 2020, Detective Chinatown, The Great Ruler, Everyone Wants to Meet You, Winter Begonia, My Roommate Is a Detective, We Are All Alone, In a Class of Her Own, The Blooms at Ruyi Pavilion, Hikaru no Go, Dear Missy, Her Fantastic Adventures, Special Lady
2021	The Knockout, Warm on a Cold Night, Ping Pong, In Love with Your Dimples, First Love Again, The Pavilion, Wisher, Who Is the Murderer, Rising With the Wind
2022	Dreamcatcher, Dr. Tang, Gold Panning
2023	As Husband as Wife, Beauty of Resilience, Love You Seven Times
2024	Tell No One, Interlaced Scenes, 21 Days
2025	A Life for a Life

== Supervising producer credits ==
Year	Productions
2024	Safety Crisis (《安全危机》), Yanhuo Mingcheng (《焰火明城》), King of Comedy (《喜剧之王》), Yuren Bushu (《遇人不熟》)
