= Dai Weimin =

Chinese general

- 戴维民
- Born: May 1962 (age 64); Xuancheng, Anhui, China
- Military career
- Allegiance: People's Republic of China
- Branch: People's Liberation Army Ground Force
- Service years: 1990s–2014
- Rank: Major general
- Commands: Deputy Dean at the People’s Liberation Army Nanjing Political College (2013–2014)

Chinese name
- Traditional Chinese: 戴維民
- Simplified Chinese: 戴维民
Transcriptions
Standard Mandarin
- Hanyu Pinyin: Daì Weímín

Dai Weimin (born May 1962) is a former officer in the Chinese People's Liberation Army. He obtained the rank of major general (Shao Jiang) in 2010 and served as deputy dean at the PLA Nanjing Political College. He was investigated by the PLA's anti-graft agency in November 2014.

== Life and career ==
Dai was born and raised in Xuancheng, Anhui province. During the early 1980s, he entered the East China Normal University, studying library science under He Jinduo and Liu Zhongtao. Then he earned a Doctor of Literature degree from Fudan University.

In the early 1990s, he was assigned to Air Force Institute of Politics of Shanghai, and he served as Library curator and director of Information Management Department of People's Liberation Army Nanjing Political College, Shanghai.

He served as deputy head of Training Department of PLA Nanjing Political College in 2006, and four years later promoted to the head position.

In 2013, he was promoted again to become the deputy dean at the People's Liberation Army Nanjing Political College.

In November 2014, he was taken away by the People's Liberation Army's prosecution organs.
