= Aleksandar Kavčić =

Serbian electrical engineer, university professor and philanthropist

Aleksandar Kavčić Александар Кавчић
- Born: 1968 (age 57–58); Belgrade, Yugoslavia
- Education: University of Belgrade School of Electrical Engineering, Ruhr-University Bochum, and Carnegie Mellon University
- Scientific career
- Fields: Electrical engineering
- Workplaces: Carnegie Mellon University, Harvard University, University of Hawai'i at Manoa.
- Website: fondacijaalekkavcic.org

Aleksandar Kavčić (Serbian Cyrillic: Александар Кавчић; born 1968 in Belgrade) is a Serbian electrical engineer, university professor and philanthropist who is currently active as an Adjunct Professor of Electrical Engineering at the Carnegie Mellon University. Since 2007 to 2017 he was a Professor of Electrical Engineering at the University of Hawai'i at Manoa. From 2002 to 2006 Kavčić was a John L. Loeb Associate Professor of Natural Sciences at Harvard University, and from 1998 to 2002 in the Division of Engineering and Applied Sciences at Harvard University as Assistant Professor of Electrical Engineering.

== Biography ==
He studied at the prestigious Belgrade Mathematical Gymnasium and University of Belgrade School of Electrical Engineering. Kavčić moved abroad due to the civil war which took place in former Yugoslavia. He received the Dipl.-Ing. degree in Electrical Engineering from Ruhr University Bochum, Germany in 1993, and the Ph.D. degree in Electrical and Computer Engineering from Carnegie Mellon University, Pittsburgh, Pennsylvania in 1998.

Prior to 2007 Kavčić served as an assistant professor, associate professor and professor of electrical engineering at Harvard University. From 2007 to 2017 he worked at the University of Hawai'i at Manoa as a Professor of Electrical Engineering. He also served as visiting associate professor at the City University of Hong Kong in the Fall of 2005 and as visiting scholar at the Chinese University of Hong Kong in the Spring of 2006.

In 2016, the Carnegie Mellon University won a lawsuit against the Marvell Technology Group for infringing intellectual property of Kavčić and his mentor Jose Moura, gaining a settlement of US$750,000,000.

He is the founder of "Alek Kavčić Foundation" which has the goal to provide high-quality textbooks available for free download for all elementary school students in Serbia. Over the years, he donated new computers to a number of high schools in Serbia.

Kavčić resides in Austin and Belgrade.

== Political career ==
In the 2020 Serbian parliamentary elections, he was a candidate for MP on the electoral list of the Enough is Enough (DJB) party, and Kavčić was presented as the president of the party education board. The party failed to pass the electoral threshold, and Kavčić decided to leave the party.

== Selected works ==
- The Viterbi algorithm and Markov noise memory, co-author, 2000
- Binary intersymbol interference channels: Gallager codes, density evolution, and code performance bounds, co-author, 2003
- Equal-diagonal QR decomposition and its application to precoder design for successive-cancellation detection, co-author, 2005
- Simulation-based computation of information rates for channels with memory, co-author, 2006
- The feasibility of magnetic recording at 10 terabits per square inch on conventional media, co-author, 2009
