= Silicon Box =

Singaporean semiconductor packaging and assembly company

Silicon Box Pte Ltd
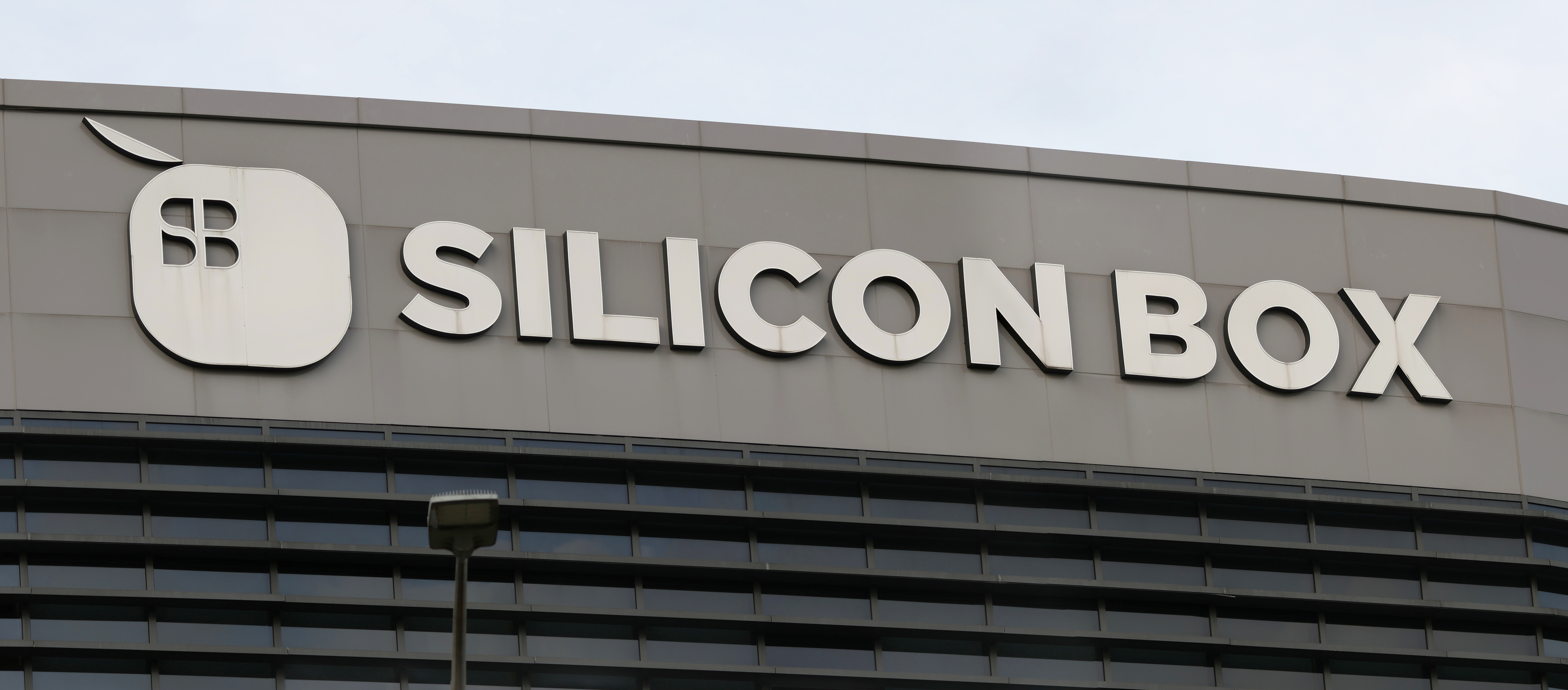
- Silicon Box's logo on its factory in Tampines, Singapore
- Company type: Private
- Founded: 2021; 5 years ago
- Founder: Han Byung Joon; Sehat Sutardja; Weili Dai
- Headquarters: Singapore
- Key people: Han Byung Joon (CEO)
- Website: www.silicon-box.com

Silicon Box Pte Ltd is an independent advanced packaging and integration BEOL semiconductor company headquartered in Singapore.

Founded in 2021 by Byung Joon Han, Sehat Sutardja and Weili Dai, the company provides backend infrastructure needed for enabling chiplet adoption.

Considered as a pioneer in the field, Silicon Box functions like an OSAT but also provides design consulting services for companies looking to transition from traditional packaging schemes to high powered alternatives.

Chiplets, the company explains, enable "dramatically better performance, smaller device sizes, and improved device reliability". According to the company, its sub-5-micron proprietary fabrication method has given it the "ability to package chiplets with the shortest interconnections" and "the world's first standardised large-format production for chiplet integration".

== History ==
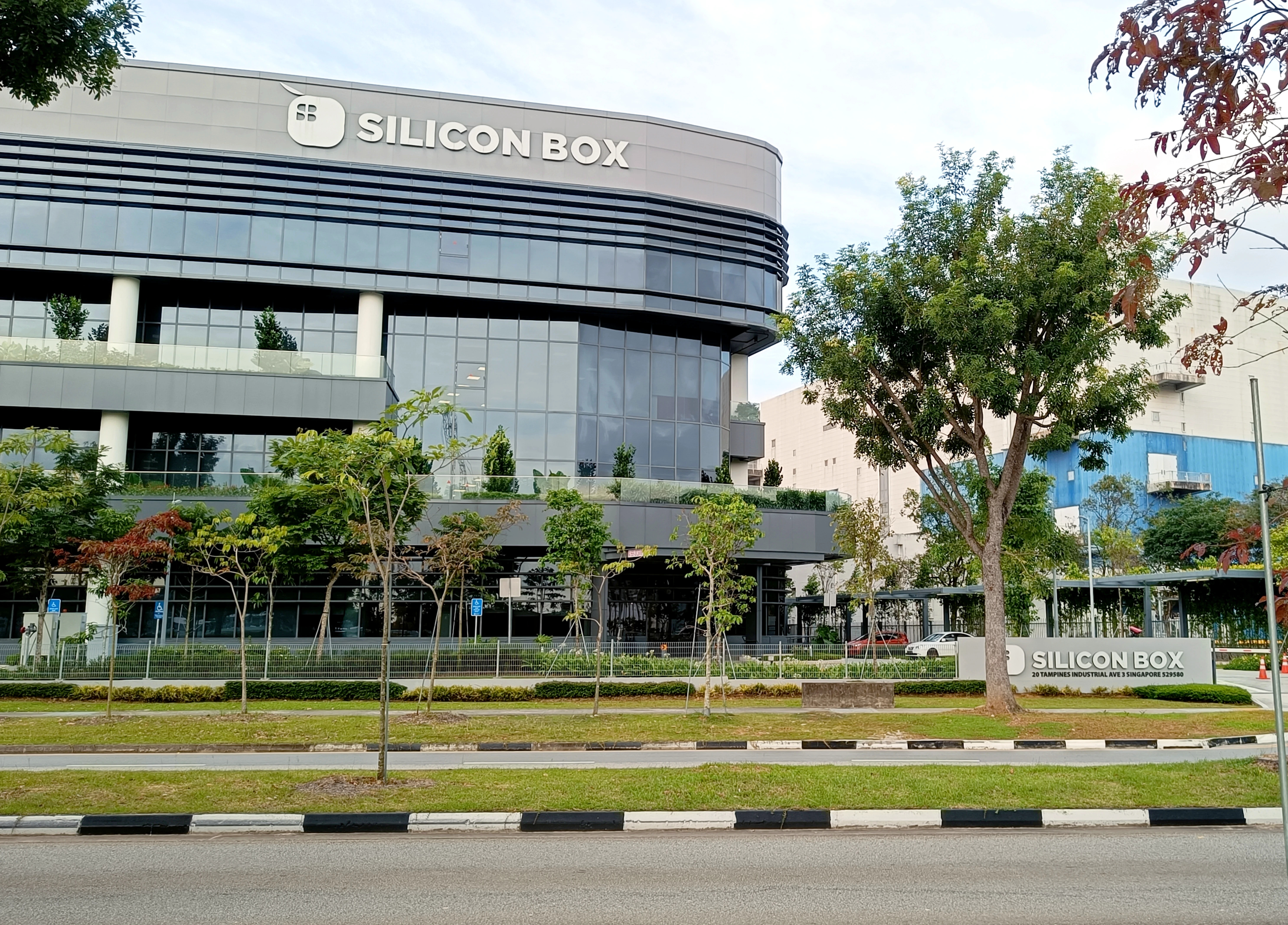
Silicon Box's factory in Tampines, Singapore

The founding history of Silicon Box, as described on the company's website, dates back to the 1980s. Co-founders Han Byung Joon, Sehat Sutardja, and Weili Dai had anticipated potential challenges in the trajectory of Moore's law and were already discussing ideas on how to ensure the sustainability of the semiconductor industry.

In 2015, Sutardja commercialized the first chiplet platform but faced a lack of back-end infrastructure to support scalability. After Sutardja and Dai left Marvell, they focused their efforts on building an ecosystem for scaling chiplet architecture.

After 40 years of pursuing their professional specialization, Han in advanced packaging, Sutardja in design, and Dai in business management, the co-founders reunited in 2021 to establish Silicon Box.

The company was founded in 2021 by Han Byung Joon, Sehat Sutardja, and Weili Dai.

On July 22, 2022, Silicon Box's first manufacturing facility broke ground. Construction was completed in 11 months.

On July 20, 2023, a grand opening ceremony was attended by Mr. Png Cheong Boon, Chairman of the Economic Development Board (EDB), ecosystem partners, and investors.

In July 2023, it opened a new factory in Singapore that cost US$2 billion to construct. The factory, which is located in Tampines and has an area of 73,000 square meters, will manufacture semiconductor chiplet interconnections. According to the company, the factory will employ 1,200 additional persons in Singapore.

In January 2024, it was reported that the company had successfully raised US$200 million at a total valuation of over US$1 billion in a series B fundraising round. The investors in that round included BRV Capital, Lam Capital, TDK Ventures, and the company's three co-founders.

In March 2024, the company stated that it would invest EUR 3.2 billion in a new manufacturing plant in northern Italy, as part of project backed by the Italian ministry of industry. The project was expected to create at least 1600 new jobs directly, with additional jobs created indirectly to support construction of the facility and supply and logistics for the plant.

== Leadership ==
Han Byung Joon serves as the chief executive of the company.
