= PLX Technology =

American manufacturer of integrated circuits

- Founded: 1986; 40 years ago
- Founder: Mike Salameh
- Defunct: August 14, 2014; 12 years ago
- Fate: Acquired by Broadcom Inc.
- Headquarters: Sunnyvale, California

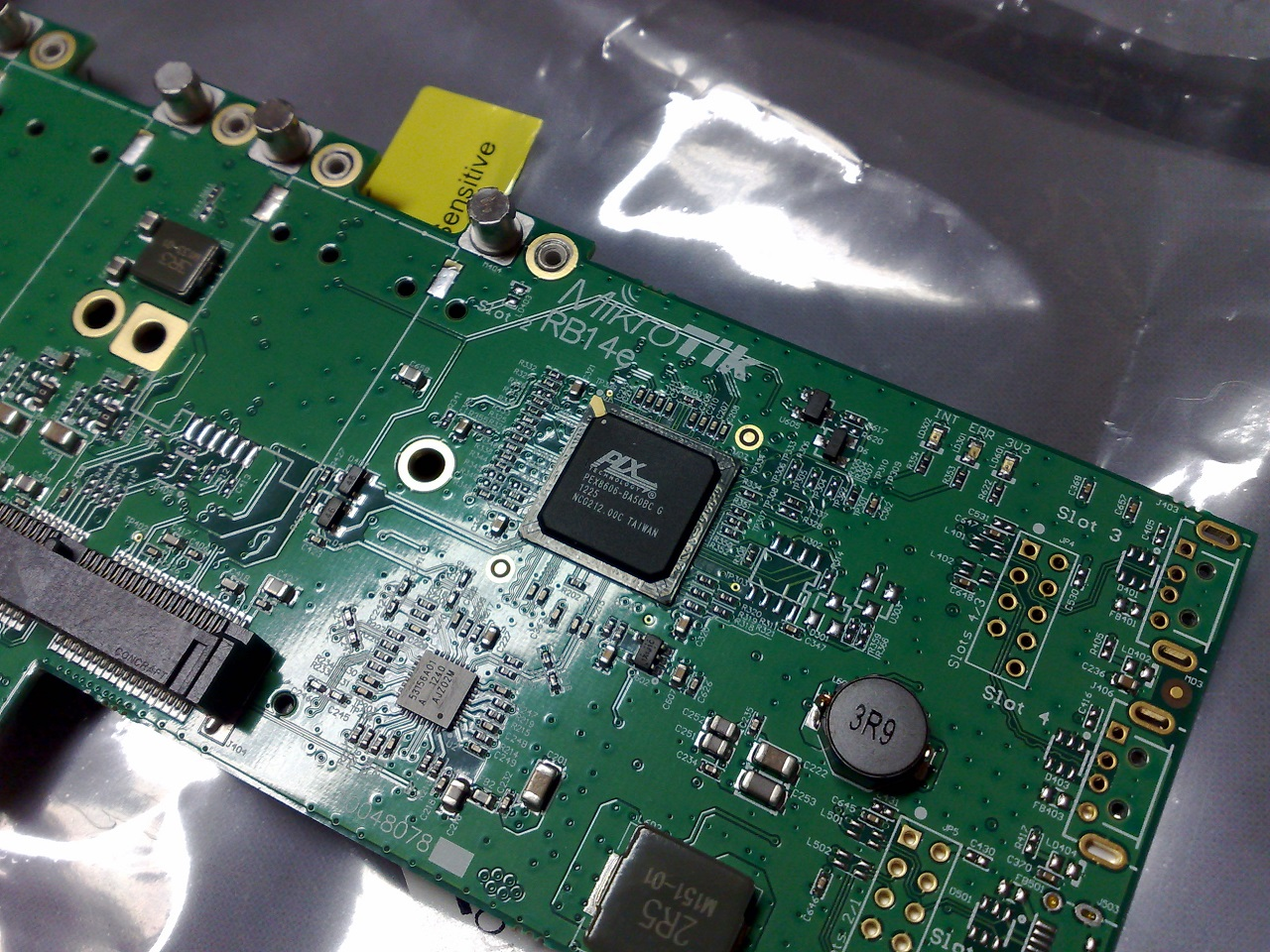
PLX Technology PEX8606 PCI Express switch on a PCI Express ×1 card, creating multiple endpoints out of one endpoint and allowing it to be shared by multiple devices

PLX Technology was a manufacturer of integrated circuits focused on PCI Express and Ethernet technologies. On August 12, 2014, Broadcom Inc. (formerly Avago Technologies), acquired the company.

== History ==
The company was founded in 1986 by Mike Salameh.

On April 7, 1999, during the dot-com bubble, the company became a public company via an initial public offering.

By July 1999, shares were up 426% since the IPO price.

In July 2000, the company opened an office in Austin, Texas.

In May 2003, the company acquired HiNT for $12.7 million in cash and stock.

In May 2004, the company acquired NetChip Technology.

In August 2008, the company launched three PCIe switch devices with integrated direct memory access engines.

In October 2008, Ralph Schmitt was named president and CEO of the company, replacing co-founder Mike Salameh.

In January 2009, the company acquired Oxford Semiconductor for 5.6 million shares of PLX common stock, and a promissory note for $14.2 million.

In April 2009, the company released new PCIe switches.

In November 2009, the company completed a new design on 40 nm process technology at TSMC, a half-node of TMSCs 45 nm process.

In January 2010, the company shipped its one-millionth network attached storage device.

In September 2010, the company acquired Teranetics for $36 million.

In October 2011, the company sold its development centre in Abingdon-on-Thames, IP licences, and a 40-person team to OCZ.

In April 2012, Integrated Device Technology announced an agreement to acquire the company. However, in December 2012, the agreement was terminated after the Federal Trade Commission challenged the merger.

In September 2012, the company sold its 10GBASE-T assets to Aquantia Corporation.

On August 12, 2014, Broadcom Inc. acquired the company.
