= Aquantia Corporation =

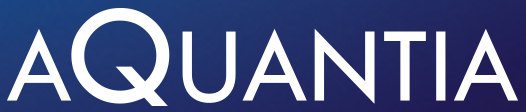
- Type: Public
- Traded as: NYSE: AQ; Russell 2000 Component
- Industry: High-speed transceivers
- Founded: 2004; 22 years ago
- Founders: Ramin Farjadrad, Ramin Shirani, Phil Delansay, Bill Woodruff
- Defunct: September 19, 2019; 6 years ago
- Fate: Acquired by Marvell Technology Group, brand was phased out
- Headquarters: San Jose, California
- Owner: Marvell Technology, Inc.
- Website: web.archive.org/web/20190901124939/https://www.aquantia.com/

Aquantia Corporation was a manufacturer of high-speed transceivers. In 2004, Aquantia Corporation was founded and first made products for Data Center connectivity. In 2008, it shipped the first monolithic 10GBASE-T PHY silicon at 5W — under half the power of incumbent solutions — winning the socket in Cisco's first 10GBASE-T product. In 2013 announced the world's first integrated 10GBASE-T MAC/PHY for servers. In 2014, Aquantia founded the NBASE-T Alliance together with Cisco, Xilinx and Freescale. In the same year they introduced a technology that delivered a boost to Ethernet throughput and was aimed to help with an expected increase in mobile broadband traffic. The NBASE-T Alliance promoted the 2.5GBASE-T and 5GBASE-T standard, which was ratified as the 802.3bz standard by the IEEE in 2016. The standard enabled Cat5e cables to carry 2.5 and 5 Gb of data per second and Cat6 cables to carry 5 Gbps. In 2016, Aquantia announced a Simultaneous Bi-Directional (SBD) PAM4 transceiver technology that made it possible to achieve up to 100Gbps over a copper cable. In 2018, Aquantia brought its SBD PAM4 technology to the IEEE standards body as a way to deliver multi-Gig Ethernet for self-driving vehicle networks while halving the number of cables required in the car. In 2020, the IEEE ratified the 802.3ch standard — defining 2.5GBASE-T1, 5GBASE-T1, and 10GBASE-T1 — based on the SBD PAM4 technology. That same year, the IEEE began extending the same technology to data rates of 25–100 Gbps as 25GBASE-T1 and 100GBASE-T1.

It won Company of the Year at the 2014 annual Creativity in Electronics awards, and was ranked by Deloitte Fast 500 as the fastest-growing semiconductor company in North America in 2014, 2015 and 2016. In 2016, Aquantia was named a finalist in UBM Tech’s EE Times and EDN Annual Creativity in Electronics (ACE) Awards for “Company of the Year".

The company was acquired by Marvell Technology Group on September 19, 2019. The Aquantia brand was since phased out and replaced with Marvell brand. Aquantia's website was, for short time, redirecting to Marvell's website, but then it was shut down completely.

== Acquisitions ==
Aquantia acquired the 10GBASE-T assets of PLX Technology in September 2012. PLX had picked them up in September 2010 from Teranetics.
