= Sehat Sutardja =

Indonesian-born American businessman (1961–2024)

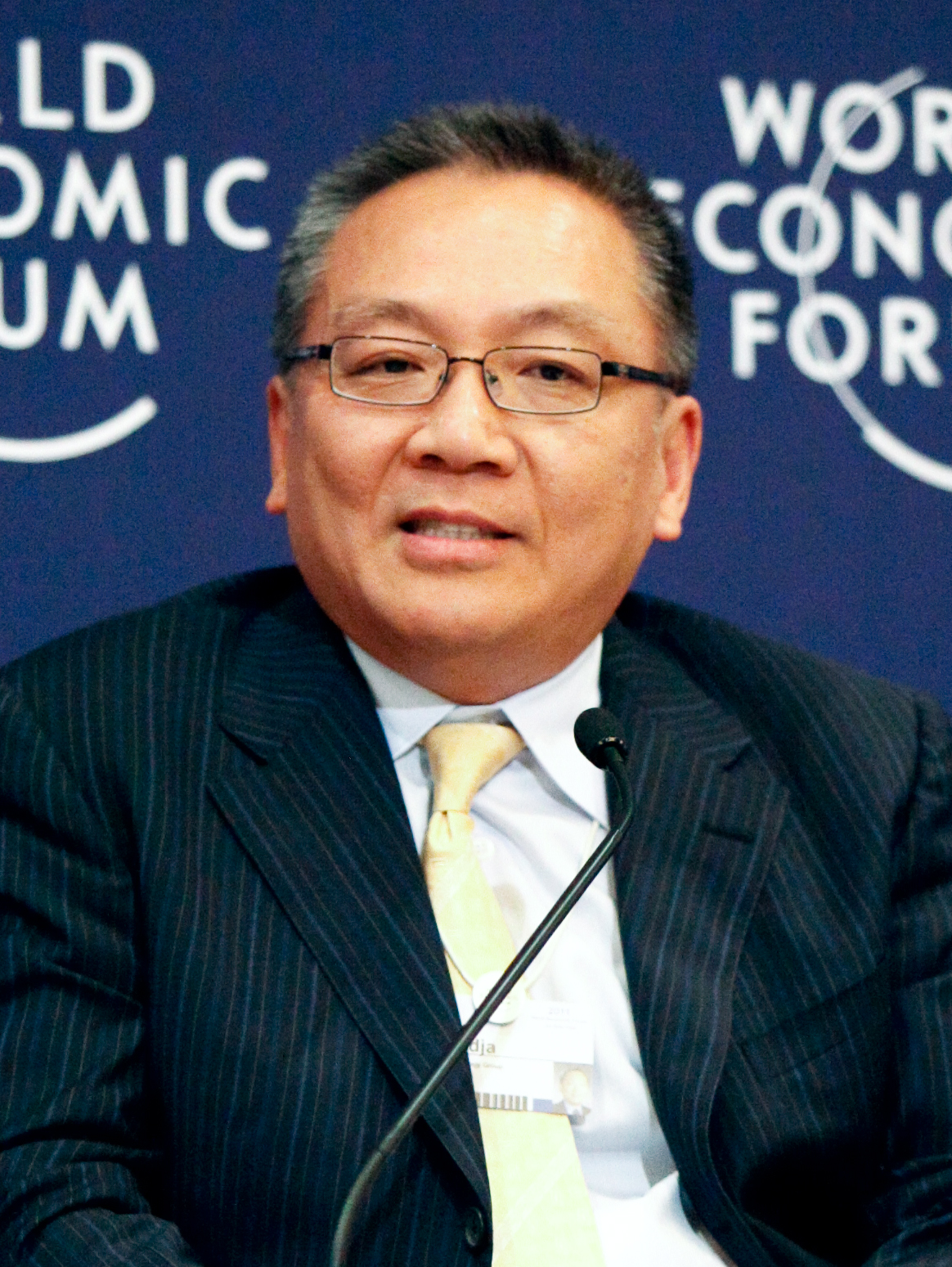
- Sutardja in 2011
- Born: July 9, 1961; Jakarta, Indonesia
- Died: September 18, 2024 (aged 63); Las Vegas, Nevada, U.S
- Education: Iowa State University (BS); University of California, Berkeley (MS, PhD)
- Known for: Co-founder of Marvell Technology
- Spouse: Weili Dai (m. 1985)
- Children: 2

Sehat Sutardja (Chinese: 周秀文; pinyin: Zhōu Xiùwén; July 9, 1961 – September 18, 2024) was an Indonesian-born Chinese American billionaire businessman who was the co-founder of Marvell Technology. Marvell was involved with industry segments including data storage, mobile and smart TVs. At the time of his death, Forbes estimated his net worth at US$1.3 billion, making him the 2,390th richest person in the world.

== Early life ==
Sehat Sutardja was born on July 9, 1961, in Jakarta, Indonesia, to a Chinese-Indonesian family. His interest in electronics began early; he became a certified radio repair technician at age 13 and has been designing components and systems ever since.

Sutardja graduated from Canisius College, a high school in Jakarta. Moving to the United States in 1980, he received a Bachelor of Science degree in electrical engineering from Iowa State University. He also held a Master of Science and Doctorate in electrical engineering and computer science from the University of California, Berkeley.

== Career ==
Sehat Sutardja worked at Micro Linear Corp. and Integrated Information Technology. In 1995 he founded Marvell Technology with his wife Weili Dai and brother Pantas Sutardja.

Sutardja has more than 440 patents and was a fellow of the Institute of Electrical and Electronics Engineers (IEEE). In 2004, Sutardja along with fellow Marvell co-founders Dai and Pantas received the Ernst & Young Entrepreneur of the Year award in the networking and communications category. In 2006, he was recognized as the Inventor of the Year by the Silicon Valley Intellectual Property Law Association.

In 2012, Sutardja was awarded the Indonesian Diaspora Lifetime Achievement Award for Global Pioneering and Innovation at the first-ever Congress of Indonesian Diaspora, presented by the Embassy of the Republic of Indonesia. In 2013, Sutardja was selected to join the Junior Achievement Business Hall of Fame. On December 16, 2013, Sehat Sutardja and Dai were honored with the 2013 Dr. Morris Chang Exemplary Leadership Award by the Global Semiconductor Alliance. In 2004, Sutardja was an award recipient for the Northern California Region of the EY Entrepreneur of the Year Award. On July 21, 2015, Sutardja was named "Executive of the Year" by the annual ACE Awards. On April 4, 2016, Sutardja was removed from his position as CEO.

On April 5, 2016, Reuters reported that Sutardja, who was CEO of Marvell Technology Group, along with his wife, Dai, the company's President, had stepped down. Marvell said that an investigation found no fraud but that there was significant pressure from the management on sales to meet revenue targets. The company's audit committee also pointed that some transactions revenue was booked prematurely due to internal controls that were not fully followed.

In 2021, together with his wife Weili Dai, and business partner Byung Joon Han, he founded Silicon Box, a Singapore-based semiconductor company that focuses on the design and manufacture of chiplet packaging. The venture-backed company opened a $2 billion facility in Tampines in 2023 to produce chiplets for their customers primarily in the artificial intelligence domain.

Sutardja was a board member of Alphawave IP Group and its second-largest shareholder. Upon his death, Dai inherited his stake and joined the board of directors on an interim basis. Her stake was valued at $237 million in June 2025, when Qualcomm announced it would acquire the company.

== Causes and philanthropy ==
Sutardja promoted new green energy efficiency standard for consumer electronics, working with both the U.S. and Chinese governments to establish efficiency performance standards that could produce significant cost and carbon savings. In 2010, he served as the principal founder of the Smart Electronics Initiative, a cross-industry collaborative campaign aimed at increasing awareness for the growing amount of energy consumed by everyday consumer electronics. Launched at Marvell with former Governor Arnold Schwarzenegger in cooperation with the Silicon Valley Leadership Group, the project focused on combatting the rising degree of energy dependence.

Sutardja has also been an active philanthropist, particularly in the areas of green technology and education. He and his wife were early proponents of the One Laptop per Child program, providing the financial support and cutting-edge technology that has enabled the organization to give more than 2 million school-aged children new learning opportunities in developing countries around the world.

In March 2009, Berkeley named one of its university hall's the Sutardja Dai Hall in honor of the Marvell founders following a more than $20 million investment toward the establishment of the college's nano-fabrication laboratory. The hall houses the Center for Information Technology Research in the Interest of Society (CITRIS).

== Personal life and death ==
While at UC Berkeley, Sutardja met Weili Dai in a campus elevator and married her in 1985. Sutardja and his wife Dai had two sons together. Sutardja died on September 18, 2024, in Las Vegas, Nevada, at the age of 63.
