= Inphi Corporation =

American technology company

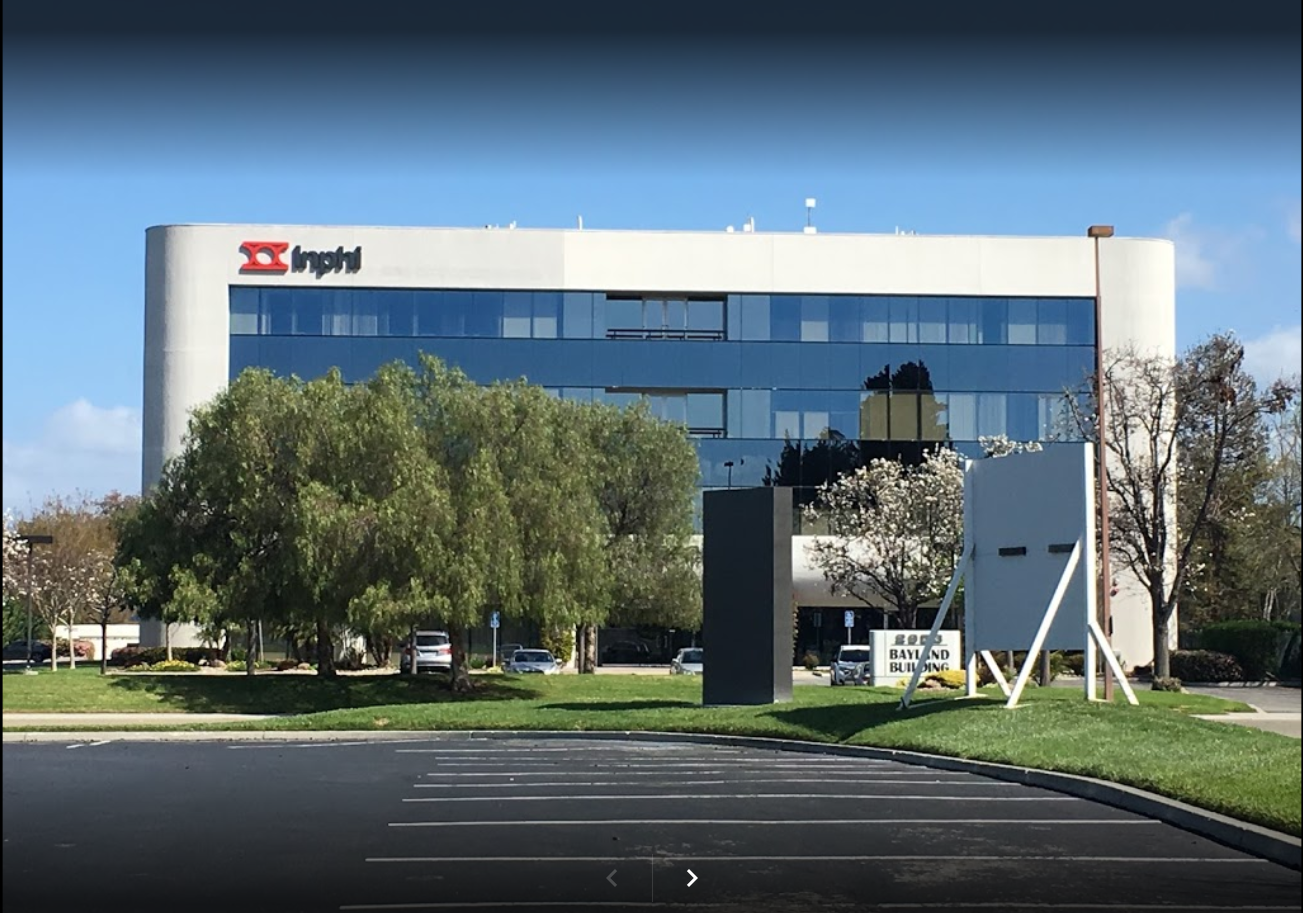
- Inphi headquarters in Santa Clara, California, USA
- Type: Subsidiary
- Traded as: Nasdaq: IPHI
- Industry: Semiconductors
- Founded: November 2000; 26 years ago
- Founders: Gopal Raghavan; Tim Semones; Loi Nguyen
- Headquarters: Santa Clara, California, U.S.
- Key people: Ford Tamer (CEO); John Edmunds (CFO); Radha Nagarajan (CTO)
- Products: Transimpedance amplifiers; Modulator Drivers; Coherent and PAM DSPs; Optical Transceiver Module; Optical PHY devices; Silicon photonic-based subsystems
- Revenue: ▲US$683 million (2020)
- Total assets: ▲US$1,008 million (2020)
- Number of employees: 1,086 (2020)
- Parent: Marvell Technology, Inc.
- Website: inphi.com

Inphi Corporation is an American company that produces 10G-800G high-speed analog and mixed-signal semiconductor components and optical subsystems to networking original equipment manufacturers (OEMs), optical module, cloud and telecom service providers. Its headquarters are located in Santa Clara, California. Inphi develops linear transimpedance amplifiers, modulator drivers, optical physical layer devices, coherent DSPs, and silicon photonic-based subsystems for long haul, metro, and data center applications. As of April 20, 2021, the company was acquired by Marvell Technology, Inc.

== History ==
Inphi was founded in 2000 by Gopal Raghavan, Tim Semones and Loi Nguyen to provide high-speed analog, DSP, and optical semiconductor solutions for the cloud and service provider communication markets. On July 30, 2014, Inphi completed the acquisition of Cortina Systems, Inc., in a transaction valued at $131 million including its High-Speed Interconnect and Optical Transport product lines. On August 4, 2016, Inphi completed the sale of its memory product business to Rambus Inc. for $90 million in cash. In December 2016, it acquired ClariPhy Communications, Inc. for $277 million in cash. On November 11, 2019, Inphi and Synopsys announced the acquisition of eSilicon. As part of the acquisition, Inphi paid $216 million, in both cash and the assumption of debt for eSilicon. This added 2.5D packaging, SerDes and custom silicon design products to the Inphi Portfolio. In February 2020, Inphi announced the world's first 800 Gbps PAM4 electro-optics platform.

In October 2020, Marvell Technology, Inc. announced it would acquire Inphi for $8.2 billion. The acquisition completed in April 2021.

== Products ==
Inphi products include optical and networking physical layer solutions for cloud and telecom markets. Common applications for its products include long haul and metro, inside and between data center interconnects, 5G, access, and cable.
Core technologies:

- High-speed analog ICs
- PAM4
- Coherent DSPs
- Silicon photonics
- Digital signal processors
- TiAs
- Drivers
- Retimers
- Gearbox
- Opto-electronics

Franchise products:

- COLORZ
- Polaris™ 1st 200G PAM4 DSP
- Vega™ PAM4 FEC Gearbox Retimer
- Porrima™ 400G PAM4 DSP
- Spica™ 800G DSP
- PAM4 Silicon
- DWDM optical modules

== See also ==
- Cortina Systems
