= Marvell Technology =

American semiconductor company

Marvell Technology, Inc.

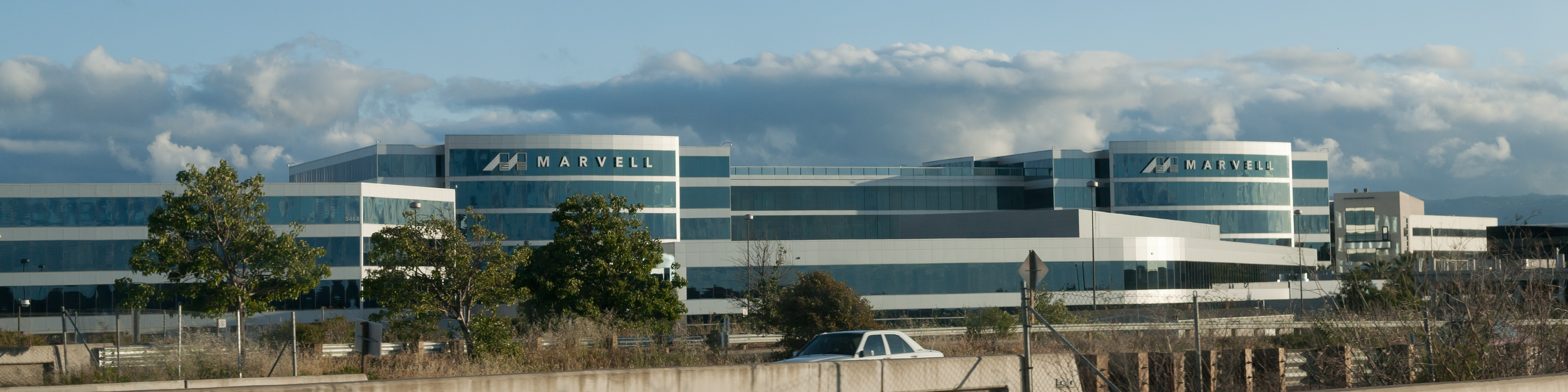
- Type: Public
- Traded as: Nasdaq: MRVL; Nasdaq-100 component; S&P 500 component
- ISIN: US5738741041
- Industry: Semiconductors
- Founded: 1995; 31 years ago
- Founders: Sehat Sutardja; Weili Dai; Pantas Sutardja
- Headquarters: Santa Clara, California, U.S.
- Key people: Matthew Murphy (chairman and CEO); Chris Koopmans (COO and president)
- Products: Semiconductor device; application-specific integrated circuit; integrated circuit; central processing unit; data processing unit
- Revenue: ▲US$8.19 billion (2026)
- Operating income: ▲US$1.32 billion (2026)
- Net income: ▲US$2.67 billion (2026)
- Total assets: ▲US$22.3 billion (2026)
- Total equity: ▲US$14.3 billion (2026)
- Number of employees: 7,480 (2026)
- Subsidiaries: Inphi Corporation; Marvell Software Solutions Israel
- Website: marvell.com
- Footnotes; Financials as of January 31, 2026.

Marvell Technology, Inc. is an American company, headquartered in Santa Clara, California, which develops and produces semiconductors and related technology. Founded in 1995, the company had close to 7,500 employees as of 2026, with over 10,000 patents worldwide, and an annual revenue of $8.2 billion for fiscal 2026.

== History ==
Marvell was founded in 1995 by Dr. Sehat Sutardja, his wife Weili Dai, and his brother Pantas Sutardja. They worked on designing a CMOS-based read channel for disk drives as its first product. Seagate Technology became its first customer.

The company's initial public offering of 6 million shares on NASDAQ under the ticker symbol MRVL on June 27, 2000 (near the end of the dot-com bubble) raised $90 million and was priced $15 per share.

In February 2003, the integrated circuit (IC) designer Marvell Technology Group closed the deal to acquire RADLAN Computer Communications for $49.7 million in cash and shares.

California-based Marvell said it would incorporate its mixed-signal ICs with RADLAN's networking infrastructure drivers, interfaces and software modules to make improved networking communications products like routers. Yuval Cohen replaced Jacob Zankel as chief executive in late 2006.

In May 2007 Radlan was officially renamed Marvell Software Solutions Israel (MSSI), to complete the integration into Marvell.

In March 2009, Marvell announced plans to reduce its workforce by ~15% in response to the deteriorating economic environment.

In May 2012, Marvell announced its first quarterly dividend.

In December 2014, Marvell expanded into 3D-printing technology with an IC and software platform designed to help manufacturers develop 3D printers.

In April 2016, CEO Sehat Sutardja and President Weili Dai were ousted from their posts after activist investor Starboard Value fund took a roughly seven percent stake in the company.

In July 2016, Marvell appointed Matt Murphy as its new president and CEO.

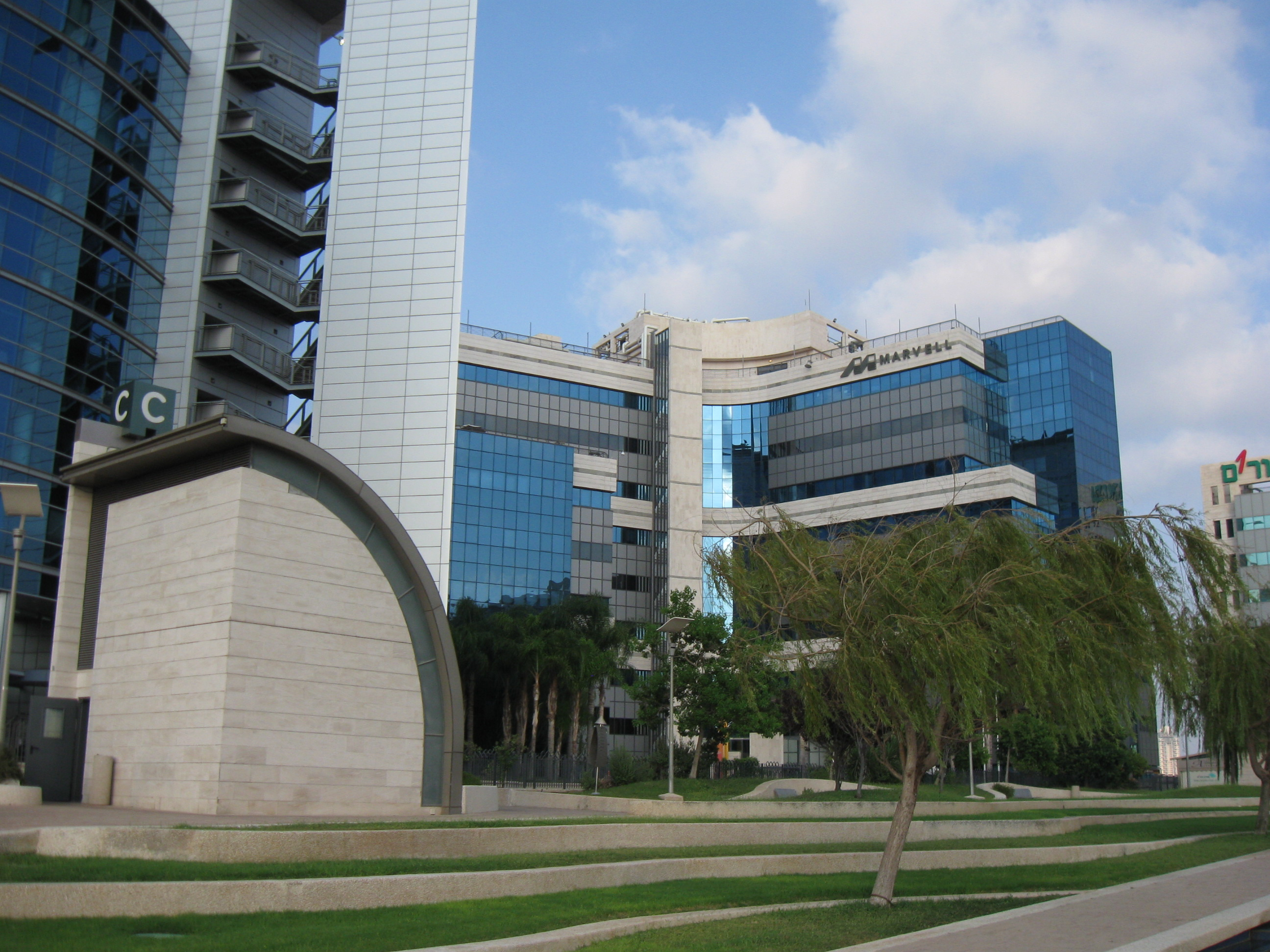
Marvell's development center in Petah Tikva, Israel

On July 6, 2018, Marvell completed its acquisition of Cavium, Inc. On the same day, it announced the appointment of Syed Ali (co-founder of Cavium, Inc., and previously the company's president and CEO), Brad Buss (director of Cavium, Inc.) and Edward Frank (director of Cavium, Inc.) to the Marvell Board of Directors.

In September 2019, Marvell completed the acquisition of Aquantia.

In April 2021, Marvell completed the acquisition of Inphi Corporation. As part of the acquisition, Marvell reorganized so that the combined company is domiciled in Wilmington, Delaware.

In September 2023, Marvell Technologies acquired an expansion deal in Pune, India.

Dan Durn (formerly CFO of Adobe) has officially assumed office as the new Chief Financial Officer, effective June 15, 2026

== Acquisitions ==
Date	Acquired company	Expertise	Cost
October 2000	Galileo Technology	Ethernet switches, system controllers	$2700M in stock
June 2002	SysKonnect	PC networking	
February 2003	Radlan	Embedded networking software	$49.7M
August 2005	Hard disk controller division of Qlogic	Hard disk & tape drive controllers	$180M in cash + $45M in stock
December 2005	SOC division of UTStarcom	Wireless communications (3G)	$24M in cash
February 2006	Printer ASIC business of Avago	Printer ASICs	$240M in cash
July 2006	XScale product line from Intel	Communications processors and SOCs	$600M in cash
January 2008	PicoMobile Networks	Communication software for IWLAN and IMS	
August 2010	Diseño de Sistemas en Silicio S.A. ("DS2")	Spanish company, PLC communication ICs	
January 2012	Xelerated	Network Processors	
July 6, 2018	Cavium	ARM Processors	$6B in cash & stock
May 2019	Avera Semi	ASICs	$650 million in cash
September 2019	Aquantia Corporation	ASICs Multi-Gig Ethernet	$450 million in cash
April 2021	Inphi Corporation	Mixed-signal integrated circuit	$8.2 billion
October 2021	Innovium	Data center network switches	$1.1 billion
December 2025	Celestial AI	Photonic Fabric technology platform	$3.25 billion
April 2026	Polariton Technologies	Plasmonics-based modulation technologies	
November 2026	Lumentum	Optoelectronic device manufacture	$115 billion in stock

== Finances ==
Fiscal year	Revenue (US$ million)	Net income (US$ million)	Total assets (US$ million)	Employees
2018	2,409	521	4,708	3,749
2019	2,866	−179	10,017	5,275
2020	2,699	1,584	11,133	5,633
2021	2,969	−277	10,765	5,340
2022	4,462	−421	22,109	6,729
2023	5,920	−164	22,522	7,448
2024	5,508	−933	21,229	6,577
2025	5,767	−885	20,205	7,042
2026	8,195	2,670	22,285	7,480

== Products ==
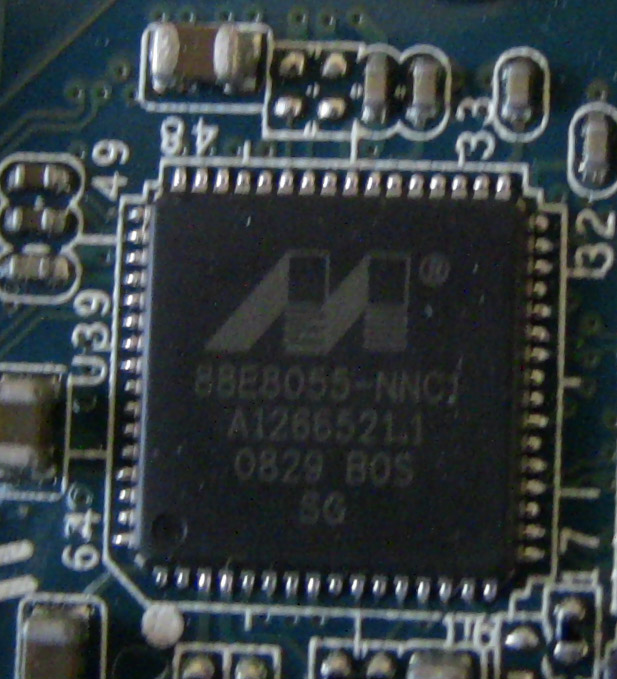
Marvell Yukon Gigabit Ethernet controller in a Sony Vaio FW series laptop

=== Data processing unit ===
Marvell OCTEON and ARMADA DPUs which integrate a CPU, network interfaces and programmable data acceleration engines on a specialized electronic circuit.

=== Custom ===
Marvell also offered Customer Specific Standard Product (CSSP), where customer accelerators and interfaces could be integrated directly into Marvell's Octeon processors. Following Marvell's 2019 acquisition of Avera Semiconductor (formerly the custom ASIC division of GlobalFoundries and prior to that of IBM), Marvell offers custom ASIC tailored to clients' specific design goals. And it provides services for ASICs development to the Aerospace and Defense industries through its independent subsidiary Marvell Government Solutions (MGS). In a joint venture with TSMC, Marvell introduced a 3nm product.

==== Infrastructure processors ====
On November 12, 2019, Marvell announced that its ThunderX2 SoCs have been deployed on Microsoft Azure. On March 2, 2020, Marvell announced OCTEON Fusion and OCTEON TX2 5G infrastructure processors, as well as deals to provide processors for 5G Infrastructure for Huawei, Nokia, Ericsson, ZTE, and Samsung. On March 16, 2020, Marvell announced ThunderX3 and its plan for ThunderX4 in 2022. On August 28, 2020, Marvell announced a plan to refocus its ThunderX Server Teams to its Custom Silicon Business.

=== Security solutions ===
Marvell's security-related products include its LiquidSecurity HSM Adapters and NITROX Cryptographic Offload Engines.

=== Networking and storage ===
Marvell's networking products include its FastLinQ Ethernet network adapters and controllers, Ethernet Switch chips for both Enterprises (Prestera) & Datacenters (Teralynx), Ethernet PHYs and Automotive Ethernet.

Marvell's products include SSD Controllers, HDD Controllers, HDD Preamplifiers, Storage Accelerators, and QLogic Fibre Channel Adapters and Controllers. On May 27, 2021, Marvell announced its first NVM Express SSD controllers to support PCI Express 5.0.

=== Other products ===
Marvell supplied the Wi-Fi chip for the original (first-generation) Apple iPhone. Marvell Mobile Hotspot (MMH) is an in-car Wi-Fi connectivity. The 2010 Audi A8 was the first automobile in the market to feature a factory-installed MMH.

Google's Chromecast products are powered by Marvell SoCs. Namely the Marvell ARMADA 1500 Mini SoC (88DE3005) for the Chromecast 1st gen and Marvell ARMADA 1500 Mini Plus SoC (88DE3006) for the Chromecast 2nd gen & Chromecast audio. Synaptics acquired Marvell Multimedia Solutions on 2017-06-12. ARMADA 1500 SoC's are now produced under different names.

== Controversies ==
=== Stock options ===
In 2006, the US Securities and Exchange Commission (SEC) started an inquiry into the company's stock option grant practices. An investigation determined "grant dates were chosen with the benefit of hindsight" to make the options more valuable. The press estimated that the founders and other executives had made $760 million in gains from the options, which were awarded by the founding couple, Sehat Sutardja and Weili Dai. The SEC asked to interview the company's general counsel Matthew Gloss, but Marvell claimed attorney–client privilege. Gloss was fired just before the investigation results were announced in May 2007.

Abraham David Sofaer was hired to investigate the investigation after Gloss alleged it was not independent. In announcing the results of its own inquiry, the SEC did not give Marvell the credit granted to other companies in the options scandal for cooperating with the SEC's investigation or for cleaning up. At the time of the announcement, the co-acting regional director of the SEC's San Francisco office stated, among other things, that the SEC did not believe that the lack of cooperation and remediation shown by Marvell merited much credit in terms of being lenient with Marvell. In announcing its results, the SEC found that Gloss was not a participant in Dai and Sutardja's backdating scheme. Marvell restated its financial results, and stated that Dai will no longer be executive vice president, chief operating officer, and director but continue with the company in a non-management position. The company agreed to pay a $10 million fine in 2008, but did not fire Dai nor replace Sutardja as chairman as stated by the investigating committee.

=== Patent infringement ===
In December 2012, a Pittsburgh jury ruled that Marvell had infringed two patents (co-inventors Alek Kavčić and Jose Moura) by incorporating hard disk technology developed and owned by Carnegie Mellon University without a license. The technology, relating to improving hard disk data read accuracy at high speeds, was reported to have been used in 2.3 billion chips sold by Marvell between 2003 and 2012. The jury awarded damages of $1.17 billion, the third largest ever in a patent case at the time. The jury also found that the breach had been "willful", giving the judge discretion to award up to three times the original damage amount. In December 2012, the company lost its mistrial bid in this dispute. Post-trial hearings were scheduled for May 2013 and Marvell reported to be considering an appeal in the interim. In August, US District Judge Nora Barry Fischer upheld the award. On February 17, 2016, Marvell agreed to a settlement in which Marvell will pay Carnegie Mellon University $750,000,000.
