= The Long Night (Chinese TV series) =

- Also known as: The night is long and dark
- Genre: Suspense, crime
- Inspired by: The Long Night by Zijin Chen
- Written by: Liu Guoqing
- Directed by: Chen Yifu
- Starring: Liao Fan, Bai Yu
- Country of origin: China
- Original languages: Chinese; Mandarin
- No. of episodes: 12 episodes

Production
- Producers: Dai Ying, Bian Jiang, Lu Dan
- Production locations: Chongqing City, China
- Running time: 45 minutes
- Production companies: Haoji Pictures, iQIYI

Original release
- Release: 16 September – 25 September 2020

The Long Night (Chinese: 沉默的真相) is a 2020 Chinese crime suspense drama, is one of the works of iQIYI's "Misty Theater". Starring Liao Fan and Bai Yu, it is adapted from the social suspense mystery novel "The Long Night Is Hard to See" published by Zijin Chen in 2017. It premiered on iQiyi on September 16, 2020.

== Broadcast time ==
Channels	location	Air Date
iQIYI	China	September 16, 2020
Now TV	Hong Kong	March 14, 2021
Chunghwa TV	South Korea	April 12, 2021
WOWOW	Japan	April 17, 2021
NHK BS4K	Japan	December 18, 2022

== Plot synopsis ==
A simple case of suicide and drowning hides a secret that cannot be told: in order to uncover the dark truth behind this secret, a group of people have gone through seven years, willing to pay countless prices, and even gamble their lives... Jiang Yang (Bai Yu), a prosecutor who originally had a bright future and was well-off, was imprisoned for two years for corruption and bribery, and his reputation was ruined. When he appeared in the public eye again, he was a corpse curled up in a suitcase. The person who transported his body was the famous local lawyer Zhang Chao (Ning Li ). The case attracted the attention of the whole city. The shrewd and capable criminal policeman Yan Liang (Liao Fan) was responsible for investigating the case and confronted Zhang Chao head-on. Zhang Chao originally admitted to the crime, but when he accepted the court's verdict, he changed his confession on the spot and produced an alibi, so the case fell into a dead end...

== Cast list ==
The cast members of this are:

Main cast

actor	Role	introduce
Liao Fan	Yan Liang	A capable and experienced criminal policeman. While investigating the subway body dumping case, he gradually discovered other more shocking truths hidden in the darkness.
Bai Yu	Jiang Yang	The prosecutor of Pingkang County. With a pure heart, he spent seven years on the case of Hou Guiping, paying countless costs such as youth, career, reputation, future, family, and even his life.

Other actors

actor	Role	introduce
Tan Zhuo	Li Jing	Hou Guiping's ex-girlfriend, Zhang Chao's wife, and Jiang Yang's classmate, asked Jiang Yang to investigate Hou Guiping's case
Ning Li	Zhang Chao	A former law professor and criminal lawyer involved in a subway body dumping case originally confessed to the crime, but then changed his statement at the last minute
Huang Yao	Zhang Xiaoqian	Jiangtan Evening News reporter, suspected to be related to Hou Guiping case or holding key evidence
Zhao Yang	Zhu Wei	Pingkang County police, together with Jiang Yang, investigate the case of Hou Guiping
Tian Xiaojie	Chen Mingzhang	Pingkang County Forensic Doctor, investigating the case of Hou Guiping with Jiang Yang
Wang Jianguo	Zhao Weimin	The Director of Jiangtan City Public Security Bureau, under the instruction of Deputy Director Gao of the Provincial Public Security Department, asked Yan Liang to investigate the subway corpse dumping case.
Cao Weiyu	Li Jianguo	The head of the criminal police brigade of the Pingkang County Public Security Bureau colluded with the Kahn Group and was later sentenced to death
Lv Xiaolin	Ren Yueting	The criminal police captain and Yan Liang are investigating the subway corpse case
Zhao Leiqi	Gu Yiming	Like Criminal Police Captain Ren Yueting, involved in the investigation of the subway body dumping case
Min Zheng	Sun Chuanfu	Chairman of the Kahn Group, suspected to be related to the Hou Guiping case
Zhang Lei	Hu Yilang	The CEO of the Kahn Group is suspected to be related to the Hou Guiping case
Lu Siyu	Hou Guiping	A volunteer teacher in Miaogao Township, Pingkang County, was identified as a sexual assaulter who fled for fear of being convicted and committed suicide by drowning, but was suspected of being framed and killed.
Niu Chao	Xiao Ma	Criminal police, follow Yan Liang to investigate the subway corpse case
Ji Yongqing	Liu Mingyang	Yan Hao is a good friend of mine, an undercover criminal policeman, who was traumatized by the mission and subsequently lived in a mental hospital
Han Shuo	Yue Jun	Nicknamed Huangmao, a subordinate of Hu Yilang, an insider of the Hou Guiping case
Ge Si	Li Dabei	The owner of the photo studio, whom Hou Guiping had once entrusted to help develop photos, which were suspected to be key evidence. He was later silenced
Zhao Yuanyuan	Wu Aike	Jiang Yang's ex-girlfriend, who initially encouraged Jiang Yang to investigate the Hou Guiping case
Chen Weihan	Ding Chunmei	The shop owner, an insider of the Hou Guiping case, and Huang Mao's (Yue Jun) mistress. She was later silenced.
Qiu Yunhe	Teacher Ma	Teacher at Miaogao Township Middle School in Pingkang County, colleague of Hou Guiping
Li Jiaxin	Weng Meixiang	A repeater at Miaogao Township Middle School in Pingkang County, Hou Guiping, committed suicide by drinking pesticides after being sexually assaulted
Wang Xiran	Ge Li	A repeater at Miaogao Township Middle School in Pingkang County, a student of Hou Guiping and a classmate of Weng Meixiang, was suspected of being sexually assaulted and coerced into giving birth to Zeng Xiangdong's son Zeng Xiaole
Huang Mengdan	Guo Hongxia	Jiang Yang's ex-wife and Jiang Yang have a son, Jiang Xiaoshu
Feng Ji	Wang Haijun	He was once a subordinate of Hu Yilang, and was instigated to kill Ding Chunmei, but was later silenced.
Fu Keyi	He Wei	The Thirteen Taibao organization, who committed a crime and was detained in Pingkang Detention Center, confessed Wang Haijun's murder in order to save his life and reduce his sentence.
Liu Sha	Han Keming	Newly appointed provincial party secretary
Hu Jian	Zeng Xiangdong	Deputy Mayor Qin Dachuan's son-in-law colluded with the Kahn Group and was involved in the sexual assault case of students in Miaogao Township

== Soundtrack ==
The soundtrack consists of:

Song Title	Lyrics	Composition	Singing	Remark
The Silent Truth	Wang Chuang	Wang Chuang	Bibi Zhou	Theme Song
Adventurous Youth	Chen Yifu, Bei Er	Bei Er	Zhong Zhiren	episode
The Long Night	Li Jiqing	Gao Weiran	Bai Yu	Jiang Yang Character Promotion Song

== Differences from the original novel ==
The film is highly faithful to the original work and basically follows the original novel, but there are still some individual details that are different.

The victim in the original novel was a young girl, not a high school repeater. In order to pass the censorship, the TV series adjusted the age of the victim. However, the newly added original character Li Xue was born in 1986, suggesting that she was not yet an adult in 2000, further enhancing the time background in the TV series. In the play, Weng Meixiang's diary mentioned that "Ge Li was pregnant", a detail that was deliberately omitted when the narration was read, leaving a certain suspense.

The TV series also added an original plot-splitting the photo into nine parts and mailing it to the newspaper. This plot did not appear in the original novel, adding more tension and plot driving force to the TV series. In addition, the criminal police Ren Yueting in the play is an original character. Her role was not mentioned in the original novel. Her prototype may be Zhao Tiemin, the captain of the criminal investigation detachment in the original novel.

The setting of the villain has also changed significantly. In the original novel, Deputy Mayor Xia Liping is the top villain, but in the TV series, his name is changed to Zeng Xiangdong, and his rank is downgraded to the son-in-law of Deputy Mayor Qin Dachuan, and his background has been weakened. Li Xue (Zhang Xiaoqian) in the play is an original character, and Ge Li, another victim in the original novel, has become a prostitute and dares not testify. The climax of the TV series, the gunfight, is also an original plot.

The villains in the original novel had almost no direct evidence of guilt, and the protagonists could only prove that Xia Liping had raped a young girl through a paternity test. In contrast, the TV series's handling of the case gave the audience more suspense and reasoning. The villains in the original novel were not punished by law. Hu Yilang, Li Jianguo and Xia Liping committed suicide one after another, while Sun Chuanfu was not mentioned at all. Forensic doctor Chen Mingzhang was sentenced for tax evasion and had nothing to do with the case itself. Zhao Tiemin, the captain of the criminal investigation detachment, was also dismissed for leaking secrets. The whole story presents a reality where procedural justice cannot be achieved.

The villain in the original novel has a much bigger background, and the deputy mayor Xia Liping is just an abandoned pawn. The ending of the story is succinctly concluded with "the big tiger fell", and through the date of the incident (July 29, 2014), it is suggested that the biggest villain may be Zhou Yongkang, then member of the Standing Committee of the Political Bureau of the CPC Central Committee and Secretary of the Central Political and Legal Affairs Commission. The TV series chose to set the background of the story in the fictional Jiangtan City, rather than Hangzhou in the original novel, which makes the TV series break away from the constraints of reality to a certain extent and create a more symbolic fictional space.

Yan Liang in the original novel was not a policeman, but the TV series changed this setting. Yan Liang in the original novel had resigned from the police force many years ago and later taught at the Department of Mathematics at Zhejiang University. In the end, Zhao Tiemin, the captain of the criminal investigation detachment, was dismissed for revealing secrets to Yan Liang, a non-police officer.

The undercover policeman Liu Mingyang in the play is a character created based on the original character Song Mingyang and has no direct connection with the main plot. However, reporter Zhang Xiaoqian establishes a connection with Liu Mingyang, which promotes the development of the plot. Screenwriter Liu Guoqing also guest-starred in the role of Jiang Yang and Wu Aike's colleague in the play, and married Wu Aike after they broke up. This setting adds a lighthearted and humorous atmosphere to the TV series.

== Reception ==
Ranked 1st on Douban's annual ratings in 2020, the highest score for mainland Chinese TV series in the past five years, and ranked 14th on Douban's high-scoring Chinese TV series list. As of November 8, 2020, "The Long Night" has a Douban score of 9.2 and 477,000 people who rated it. It is the fifth Chinese TV series with a Douban score of over 9 and more than 300,000 people who rated it, following 2006's My Own Swordsman (9.5 points, 324,000 people ), 2015's Nirvana in Fire (9.4 points, 475,000 people), 2011's The Legend of Zhen Huan (9.2 points, 335,000 people), and 2017's Day and Night (9.0 points, 426,000 people).

As the only mainland Chinese TV series with a Douban score of over 9 in 2020, "The Long Night" has been on the “Chinese TV Series Weekly Ranking” for three consecutive weeks. Netizens credit the “high opening and explosive run” of the series, with a Douban score of 9.2. The Long Night has also been commended for its use of three parallel story lines culminating in the reveal of the mystery, and the actors' performances have received unanimous praise.

Datawin Film and Television Observation analyzed the best performing artists of the week in suspense dramas. From the 38th week to the 40th week, Bai Yu ranked first. The comment: "As the highest-rated drama on Douban so far this year, "The Long Night" has been late, but it has made a big splash. After the advanced on-demand finale, the drama has experienced a period of prosperity on Datawin's TV drama prosperity list, showing that its story is profound and meaningful. What is most powerful and heartwarming is that the high reputation and high-quality production of "The Long Night" are not just sensual showmanship, but move people with their belief in justice and their tenacious but surging emotional power. Prosecutor Jiang Yang is the core character of "The Long Night". From the early immaturity and hesitation, to the long night of ten years, he risked everything for the justice in his heart, which brought a fatal emotional blow to the audience and also brought Bai Yu's re-explosion."

Phoenix Entertainment's Feng Xiangbiao list for September commented: "The Long Night is the finale of iQiyi's Misty Theater. The Feng Xiangbiao rating for The Long Night is 9.7 points, the highest score for the year's drama series. The actors' outstanding acting skills were recognized. When asked "whose performance was your favorite in the drama", 21.09% of the audience chose Bai Yu, who played Jiang Yang, and 13.19% chose Liao Fan, who played Yan Liang. Actors Zhao Yang, Tian Xiaojie, and Ning Li also ranked high."

iQiyi's self-produced suspense short series "The Long Night" has attracted the attention of many overseas media, including The Guardian, The Economist, South China Morning Post, Content Commerce Insider, SupChina, Radii, SixthTone, etc., all of which have praised the series launched by iQiyi's Misty Theater. Sixth Tone published an article stating that iQiyi's latest work "The Long Night" proves that short and powerful programs can also be loved by the audience. iQiyi Vice President Dai Ying said in an interview, "iQiyi's theatrical operation and concentrated release have successfully extended the impact cycle of short series and formed a long-tail effect." According to information, the suspense short series "The Long Night" is the fifth work launched by iQiyi in the Misty Theater. Previously, the theater has successively launched four other works, including "Ten Day Game", "The Bad Kids", "Extraordinary Witness", and "The Escape". Among them, "The Bad Kids" in iQiyi's Misty Theater was considered by Radii to have broken through the idealism of traditional Chinese drama and become a milestone in the history of Chinese TV dramas; the British "The Guardian" also pointed out that the drama triggered the beginning of innovation in Chinese-language suspense dramas led by streaming media; Content Commerce Insider emphasized its dual success in original content and commercial cooperation, achieving extremely high commercial value.

=== Social media and cultural influence ===
After its broadcast, The Long Night received widespread attention and discussion, especially on social media and public platforms. Some memorable lines, such as "tears rolled down like Lanzhou ramen" and "security guards blocked him like Indian flying cakes", triggered widespread online discussions and emoticon creation. Many viewers commented on these vivid and creative metaphors and incorporated them into daily conversations. In addition, the actors in the play also participated in humorous interactions related to these lines, further promoting the spread of topics. For example, #tears like Lanzhou ramen# became a hot topic, and the playwright Chen Zijin also responded humorously, "It tastes even better with Indian flying cakes."

The influence of the play went beyond the entertainment field and became part of social discussions. China's local procuratorates and the Supreme People's Procuratorate promoted the play on social media, triggering hot topics such as #Jiang Yang, your colleague is here# and #I want to say something to Prosecutor Jiang Yang#. At the same time, scholars also published academic discussions on the legal and moral issues in the play, and The Long Night was even selected into the twelfth volume of the college entrance examination, "Composition Materials", showing its influence in the field of education.

In addition, the series' actors and director team have also received widespread praise. On September 27, 2020, actress Yang Mi said on Weibo that she was moved to tears while watching the series, and praised the performances of Bai Yu, who played Jiang Yang, and Lu Siyu, who played Hou Guiping. In order to support his good friend Director Chen Yifu, Zhou Quan served as the second group director and filmed about a quarter of the series. Producer Lu Dan particularly emphasized the key role of Group B, saying that it was not just an auxiliary shooting, but an indispensable part of the main storyline of the series.

== Awards ==
year	Award Ceremony	Awards	Finalists	result	Ginseng
2021	iQIYI Scream Night	Top Ten Dramas of the Year		Awards	
2020	2020 Yucier Annual Ceremony	Best Drama Screenwriter	Liu Guoqing	Awards	
2020	2020 Yucier Annual Ceremony	Best Drama Director	Chen Yifu	Awards	
2020	2020 Yucier Annual Ceremony	Best web drama		Awards	
2020	Asia Weekly	Top 10 TV Dramas		Awards	
2021	Golden Pen Screenwriters Night	Best Adapted Screenplay	Liu Guoqing	Awards	
2021	Siam Film Annual Golden Award	Most Popular Chinese Web Drama Award		Nomination	
2021	The 3rd Asian Content Awards	Best OTT Original		Awards	
2021	The 3rd Asian Content Awards	Best Idea		Nomination	
2021	The 3rd Asian Content Awards	Creativity Without Boundaries Award		Nomination	
2021	The 3rd Asian Content Awards	Best Actor	Bai Yu	Nomination	
2021	The 3rd Asian Content Awards	Best Screenplay	Liu Guoqing	Nomination	
2021	Wenrong Award	Best Young Screenwriter	Liu Guoqing	Nomination	
2021	Wenrong Award	Best Young Photographer	Wang Junming	Nomination	
2021	Huading Awards	Top Ten Most Favorite Actors in China	Liao Fan	Nomination	
2021	Huading Awards	Best Actor in a Chinese Contemporary TV Series	Bai Yu	Nomination	
2021	Huading Awards	Best Producer in China's Top 100 TV Series		Nomination	
