= Xelerated =

Swedish fabless semiconductor company

Xelerated, Inc.
- Type: Private
- Industry: Semiconductor
- Founded: 2000
- Fate: Acquired by Marvell Technology Group
- Headquarters: Stockholm, Sweden
- Products: X10, X11, HX310, HX320, HX330
- Website: www.xelerated.com

Xelerated Inc., founded in 2000, was a fabless semiconductor company specializing in ASSP-based Carrier Ethernet chipsets. Xelerated carried a line of programmable Network Processing Units (NPUs) and Ethernet network switches for the Metro Ethernet, access network and high-end enterprise markets.

== Overview ==
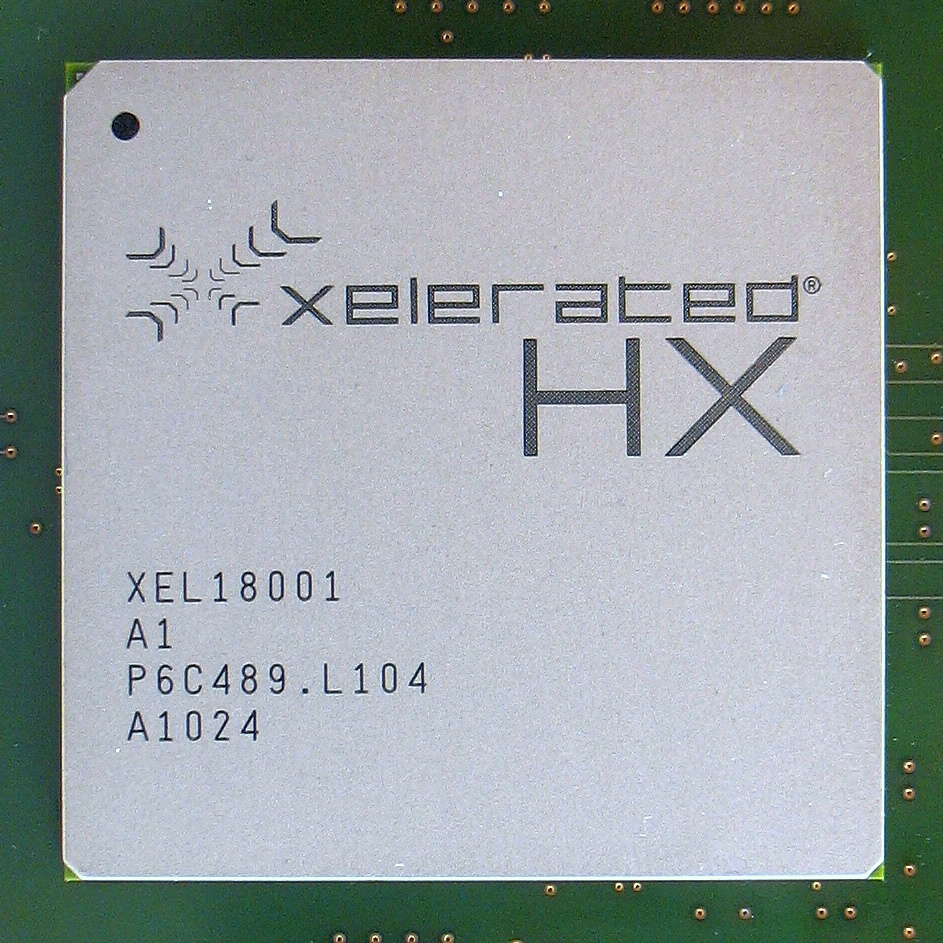
100G network-processor

Xelerated's design relies upon a patented dataflow architecture. Like an ASIC, it is optimized in relation to the flow of packets instead of the flow of instructions through a RISC core. As a result, processing speed is predictable rather than variable. Because Xelerated's NPUs and Ethernet switches were programmable, carriers could reprogram them to adapt to new standards as they develop.

The company had offices in Santa Clara, California, Stockholm, Tel Aviv and Beijing.

In January 2012, Xelerated was acquired by Marvell Technology Group for an undisclosed sum.

In May 2015, the staff was informed about pending layoffs. In December 2015, office property from the Stockholm office was auctioned off.
