= Weili Dai =

Chinese-born American businesswoman

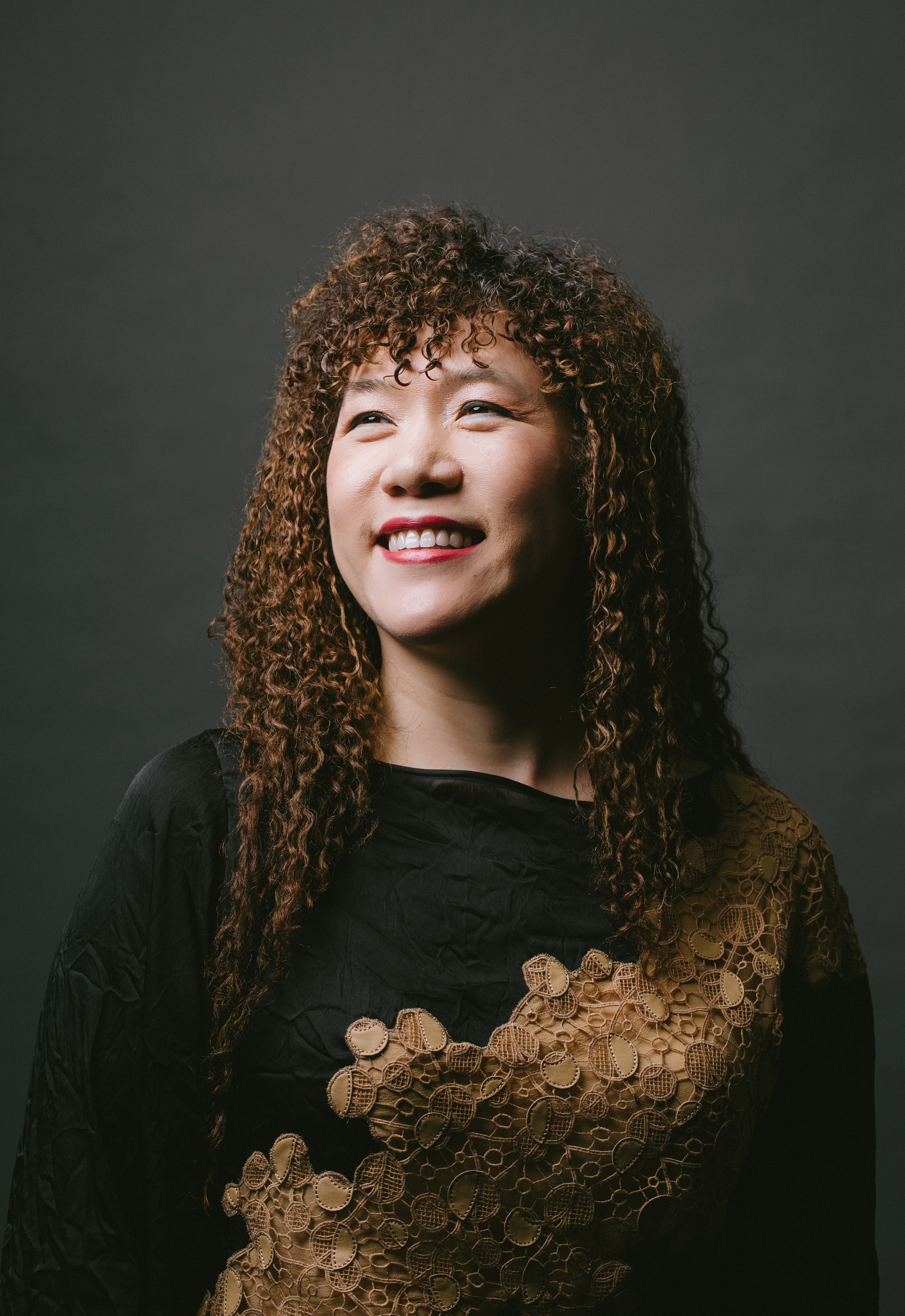
- Born: Weili Dai (戴伟立); 1961 or 1962 (age 64–65); Shanghai, China
- Education: University of California, Berkeley
- Occupation: Businesswoman
- Title: Co-founder and former president of Marvell Technology; Co-founder of Silicon Box
- Spouse: Sehat Sutardja (m. 1985; died 2024)
- Children: 2

Weili Dai (simplified Chinese: 戴伟立; traditional Chinese: 戴偉立; pinyin: Dài Wěilì) is a Chinese-born American businesswoman. She is the co-founder, former director and former president of Marvell Technology Group. Dai is a successful entrepreneur, and the only female co-founder of a major semiconductor company. In 2015, she was listed as the 95th richest woman in the world by Forbes. Her estimated net worth is US$1.3 billion, as of June 2024.

== Early life ==
Weili Dai was born in Shanghai, China, where she played semi-professional basketball before moving to the U.S. at the age of 17. She has a bachelor's degree in computer science from the University of California, Berkeley.

== Career ==
Dai was involved in software development and project management at Canon Research Center America, Inc. Dai co-founded the American semiconductor company Marvell in 1995 with her husband Sehat Sutardja and his brother. While at Marvell, Dai worked on strategic partnerships, and marketed Marvell's technology for use in products across several markets. Dai also works to increase access to technology in the developing world and served as an ambassador of opportunity between the US and China. Dai served as chief operating officer, executive vice president, and general manager of the Communications Business Group at Marvell. She was corporate secretary of the board, and a director of the board at Marvell Technology Group Ltd.

Dai promoted partnership with the One Laptop Per Child program (OLPC) and women in science, technology, engineering, and mathematics (STEM) fields.

She sits on the board of the disaster relief organization, Give2Asia, and was named to a committee of 100 representing Chinese Americans. The Sutardja Dai Hall at her alma mater, UC Berkeley, was named for Dai along with her husband Sehat Sutardja, CEO of Marvell and Pantas Sutardja, CTO of Marvell. Sutardja Dai Hall is home to the Center for Information Technology Research in the Interest of Society (CITRIS). In 2015, Dai was named to the Global Semiconductor Alliance's (GSA) board of directors, Dai is a member of the executive committee for TechNet.

Dai co-founded the startup 'MeetKai' in 2018, which is focused on digital media technology (artificial intelligence/metaverse) and as the "Official AI Partner" of the Los Angeles Chargers.

In 2021, together with her husband Sehat Sutardja and business partner Byung Joon Han, she founded Silicon Box, a Singapore-based semiconductor company that focuses on the design and manufacture of chiplet packaging. The venture-backed company opened a $2 billion facility in Tampines in 2023 to produce chiplets for their customers primarily in the artificial intelligence domain.

Upon her husband Sutardja's death in 2024, Dai inherited his stake in Alphawave IP Group and joined its board of directors on an interim basis. Her stake was valued at $237 million in June 2025, when Qualcomm announced it would acquire the company.

== Controversies ==
In 2008, the company and its then chief operating officer—and the only member of its stock option "committee" during the period in question—Weili Dai paid fines, to the Securities and Exchange Commission over charges of false financial information to investors by improperly backdating stock option grants to employees, totaling $10 million and $500,000 respectively. Dai was forced to step down as executive vice president, chief operating officer, and a director but allowed to continue with the company in a non-management position.

In 2016, Dai and her husband, Sehat Sutardja, were ousted from Marvell Technology Group, the company they had co-founded, after a months-long investigation into potential accounting fraud. The investigation found no fraud; however, it found that there were significant pressures from management to meet revenue targets and that internal controls were not fully followed and some revenues were booked prematurely early.

== Personal life ==
Dai married Sehat Sutardja in 1985, and have two sons. They moved to Las Vegas, Nevada, after being dismissed from Marvell by hostile takeover. Her husband died on September 18, 2024.
