= Nanjing Political College =

University in China

PLA Nanjing Political College
- 中国人民解放军南京政治学院
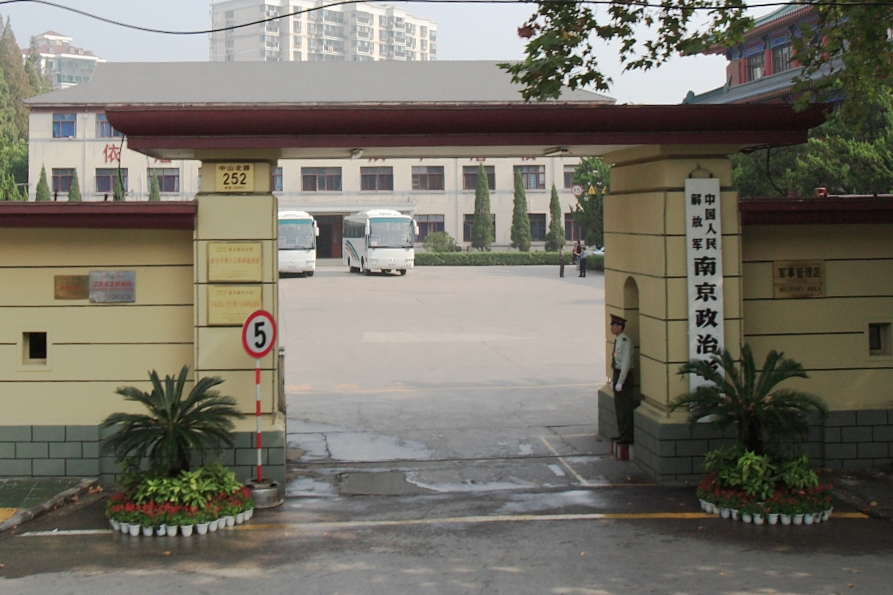
- PLA Nanjing Political College
- Type: Military college
- Established: 1977
- Affiliations: People's Liberation Army General Political Department
- President: Jiang Qianlin (蒋乾麟)
- Location: Nanjing, Jiangsu, China
- Campus: 1100 mu

The Nanjing Political College (中国人民解放军南京政治学院) was a military college of political science located in Gulou, Nanjing, Jiangsu, China. It was affiliated with the General Political Department of the People's Liberation Army. The college was merged into the College of Political Science of the People's Liberation Army National Defense University.

== History ==
It was formed in 1977 and initially called "PLA Nanjing Political School". In June 1986, it was renamed "PLA Nanjing Political College". In May 1999, PLA Air Force Political College merged into the university.

== Affiliated hospital ==
The Affiliated Hospital of PLA Nanjing Political College, was founded in 1988.
