= ESilicon =

eSilicon Corporation
- Type: Private
- Industry: Semiconductors, Electronics
- Founded: 1999; 27 years ago
- Founder: AJ Sen
- Headquarters: San Jose, California, USA
- Key people: AJ Sen (Founder); Jack Harding (CEO); Philippe Morali (CFO)
- Products: ASICs, semiconductor IP
- Number of employees: 600 (2017)
- Parent: Inphi Corporation; Synopsys
- Website: www.esilicon.com

eSilicon is a company engaged in semiconductor design and manufacturing services, that delivers custom ICs and IPs to OEMs.

== History ==
eSilicon was founded in 1999 in San Jose, California, by Anjan AJ Sen. He conceived the concept while attending Harvard Business School in 1997 based on his prior experience as a chip designer. Sen wrote the business plan, assembled the initial team, incorporated the company in November 1999, and secured key alliances with TSMC and Artisan, which led to Series A financing in March 2000. Since its founding in 1999, eSilicon has received a total of $86M in venture capital. In 2002, eSilicon became widely known as the supplier of a key Apple Inc. iPod ASIC through PortalPlayer. 2004 revenues reached $91 million largely driven by ASICs for the iPod. In 2006 Apple announced that it was changing its iPod ASIC strategy and eSilicon stopped supplying ASICs for the iPod. Following the loss of the iPod business eSilicon diversified its customer base and announced in May 2008 that it was profitable and shipping ASICs to over 50 customers. In January 2008 eSilicon acquired the assets of Swedish-based Ethernet networking switch supplier SwitchCore AB and announced that it would seek further acquisitions. Rumors of eSilicon preparing to file for an IPO have circulated on and off since 2003.

In 2011, eSilicon started the MoZAIC™ “Modular Z-axis Integrated Circuit” 2.5D ASIC program to analyze new approaches that would provide more bandwidth for customers. This includes the development of an HBM PHY in 28nm and finFET technologies as well as the study of 2.5D packaging. eSilicon has completed seven test chips to date that verify the HBM PHY IP and assemble a supply chain ecosystem in support of 2.5D integration—design, verification, test and reliability. eSilicon has multiple 14/16nm finFET 2.5D ASICs in design, with several entering production in the first half of 2018.

On November 11, 2019, Inphi, a provider of high-speed data movement interconnects, acquired eSilicon for $216 million. The completion of the acquisition was announced on January 13, 2020.

== Products ==
eSilicon range of services provides physical design, design for test insertion, traditional and 2.5D package design, product qualification, IP licensing, and manufacturing services for digital CMOS and finFET ASICs. eSilicon has announced products in .25 um, .18 um, .13 um, 90 nm, 65 nm, 40 nm, 28 nm and 14 nm process technologies. In 2017, eSilicon announced tapeout to production of one of the first 2.5D ASICs, developed on Samsung 14LPP technology. Customer ASICs have been announced in a wide range of applications including high-bandwidth networking, high-performance computing, digital cameras, hearing aids, portable multimedia players and inkjet printers.

eSilicon specializes in a high-performance, high-bandwidth IP + 2.5D solution that targets networking, high-performance computing, artificial intelligence (AI) and 5G wireless infrastructure applications by offering specialized memories with 2.5 GHz worst-case operation with more than a billion searches per second along with the 2.5D integration of 1024 GB/s data rate high-bandwidth memory (HBM2). Memory and I/O products in this category include ternary content addressable memory (TCAMs), fast cache, multi-port and asynchronous register files and HBM2 PHY.

== Manufacturing ==
As a fabless company, eSilicon outsources all of its semiconductor manufacturing to merchant foundries. It has had a relationship with TSMC as its primary foundry partner, and also has a partnership with Samsung Foundry.
