= Olivia Tai Qing Tong =

Malaysian rhythmic gymnast

Olivia Tai
- Full name: Olivia Tai Qing Tong
- Born: c. 1999

Gymnastics career
- Discipline: Rhythmic gymnastics
- Country represented: Malaysia
- College team: National Team of Rhythmic Gymnastic in Malaysia
- Club: National Team of Malaysia
Medal record
Rhythmic Gymnastics
Representing Malaysia
Asian Junior Championship
Gold medal – first place	2014 Malaysia	Clubs
Silver medal – second place	2014 Malaysia	Ribbon
Bronze medal – third place	2014 Malaysia	All-around individual

Olivia Tai Qing Tong

Chinese name
- Traditional Chinese: 戴辛彤
- Simplified Chinese: 戴辛彤
- Hanyu Pinyin: Dài Xīntóng
- Pha̍k-fa-sṳ: Tai Sîn-thùng
- Jyutping: Daai3 San1 Tung4
- Hokkien POJ: Tè Sin-tông
- Tâi-lô: Tè Sin-tông

Olivia Tai Qing Tong (Chinese: 戴辛彤; pinyin: Dài Xīntóng; Jyutping: Daai3 San1 Tung4; Pe̍h-ōe-jī: Tè Sin-tông; born c. 1999) is a Malaysian rhythmic gymnast.

== Career ==
Olivia began rhythmic gymnastics at the age of six. She has competed in Malaysia and internationally, winning a gold and a silver in the 13th Junior Asian Rhythmic Gymnastics competition. She also competed at the YOG (Youth Olympic Games) in Nanjing. Within Malaysia, she has won 5 gold and 1 bronze in rhythmic gymnastics, in the annual Sukma (Malaysia's yearly sport competition) competition.

== Personal life ==
Tai is from Kuala Lumpur, Malaysia, and studies at the Convent Bukit Nanas.
