= Unhaggle =

- Type: Automotive Pricing and Data Website
- Industry: Automotive
- Founded: 2011 (15 years ago)
- Founder: Andrew Tai; Radek Garbowski; Neal Shah; Leslie Wong
- Headquarters: 20 Queen Street West; Suite 2800; Toronto, Ontario, M5H 3R3, Canada
- Key people: Andrew Tai (CEO); Radek Garbowski (President); Neal Shah (CPO); Leslie Wong (COO)
- Products: Pricing and data for new cars
- Website: www.unhaggle.com

Unhaggle is a Canadian automotive buying, pricing, and data company.

The company was founded in 2011 by Andrew Tai, Radek Garbowski, Neal Shah, and Leslie Wong. Through Unhaggle, car buyers can view what others paid for the car they want in their local area and look up dealer invoice price reports for free, which reflect the manufacturer's wholesale price. There is also a paid service that gets dealers within a specific geographic area to compete against each other, to give buyers who do not wish to negotiate their best price. Dealers pay for knowing you are looking for a particular car.

== Early history ==
Before starting Unhaggle, Chief Executive Officer Andrew Tai had a job in the finance sector, working at Morgan Stanley and then at a private equity firm in Toronto. In 2011, he teamed up with Radek Garbowski, Neal Shah, and Leslie Wong, fellow graduates from Richard Ivey School of Business at the University of Western Ontario, to start Unhaggle. The company's headquarters are located in Toronto.

== Services ==
=== Average price and dealer cost report ===
Car buyers researching a new car on Unhaggle can find out the wholesale price, average price in their area, and relevant fees. By providing their contact information, the car buyer can also choose to be contacted by a local dealer that has signed up with Unhaggle for a price quote. As part of this service, Unhaggle provides free information on deals, incentives, and car specifications, and can also confirm which dealerships that have signed up with Unhaggle sell the car the buyer wants to buy.

=== Unhaggle Premium ===
The Unhaggle Premium service invites dealers in a defined geographic area to compete against each other to provide customers with the best car price. This service is designed for people who do not wish to negotiate for themselves and costs C$500.

== Awards ==
In 2011, Unhaggle was among twelve businesses in Canada, and the only business from the Greater Toronto Area invited to the International Startup Festival in Montreal to present to investors and industry professionals. On April 17, 2013, it won an award in the TiEQuest business competition, earning first place. Later in June, the company won the StartMeUp Ryerson's Slaight Communications Business Plan Competition.
