= Walt Jung =

American electronic engineer and author

- Born: Walter G Jung
- Known for: Author and Electronic Engineer
- Website: waltjung.org

Walter G Jung, commonly known as Walt Jung, is an American electronics engineer and author. He worked for Linear Technology and Analog Devices. He has written a number of books, the most popular of which is the IC Op Amp Cookbook, which has been in print since 1974.

He was named a Fellow of the Audio Engineering Society in 1979 for his work on distortion in operational amplifiers. He also was named to Electronic Design’s Engineering Hall of Fame in 2002. He is highly regarded as a design engineer.

== Publications ==
- Op Amp Applications Handbook; 1st Ed; Newnes; 2005; ISBN 978-0750678445.
- Audio IC Op-Amp Applications; 3rd Ed; Sams Publishing; 1987; ISBN 9780672224522.
- IC Op-Amp Cookbook; 3rd Ed; Prentice Hall; 1986; ISBN 978-0138896010.
- IC Timer Cookbook; 2nd Ed; Sams Publishing; 1983; ISBN 978-0672219320.
- IC Array Cookbook; 1st Ed; Hayden; 1980; ISBN 978-0810407626.
- IC Converter Cookbook; 1st Ed; Sams Publishing; 1978; ISBN 9780672215278.
- Unique IC Op-Amp Applications; 1st Ed; Sams Publishing; 1975; ISBN 978-0672211638.
