= Next Unit of Computing =

Small form factor PC designed by Intel

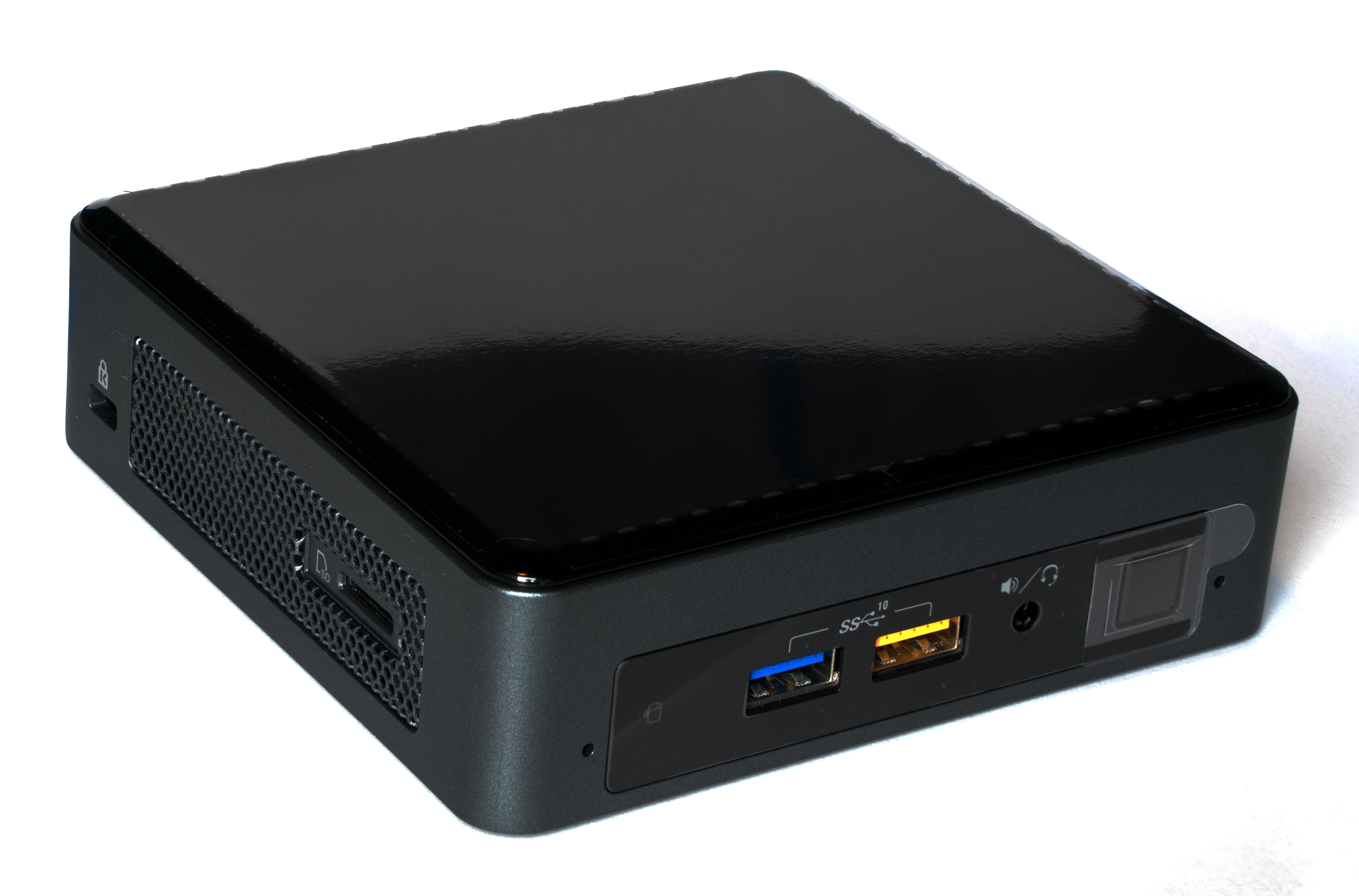
Coffee Lake-U-based Bean Canyon Intel NUC (NUC8i5BEK2)

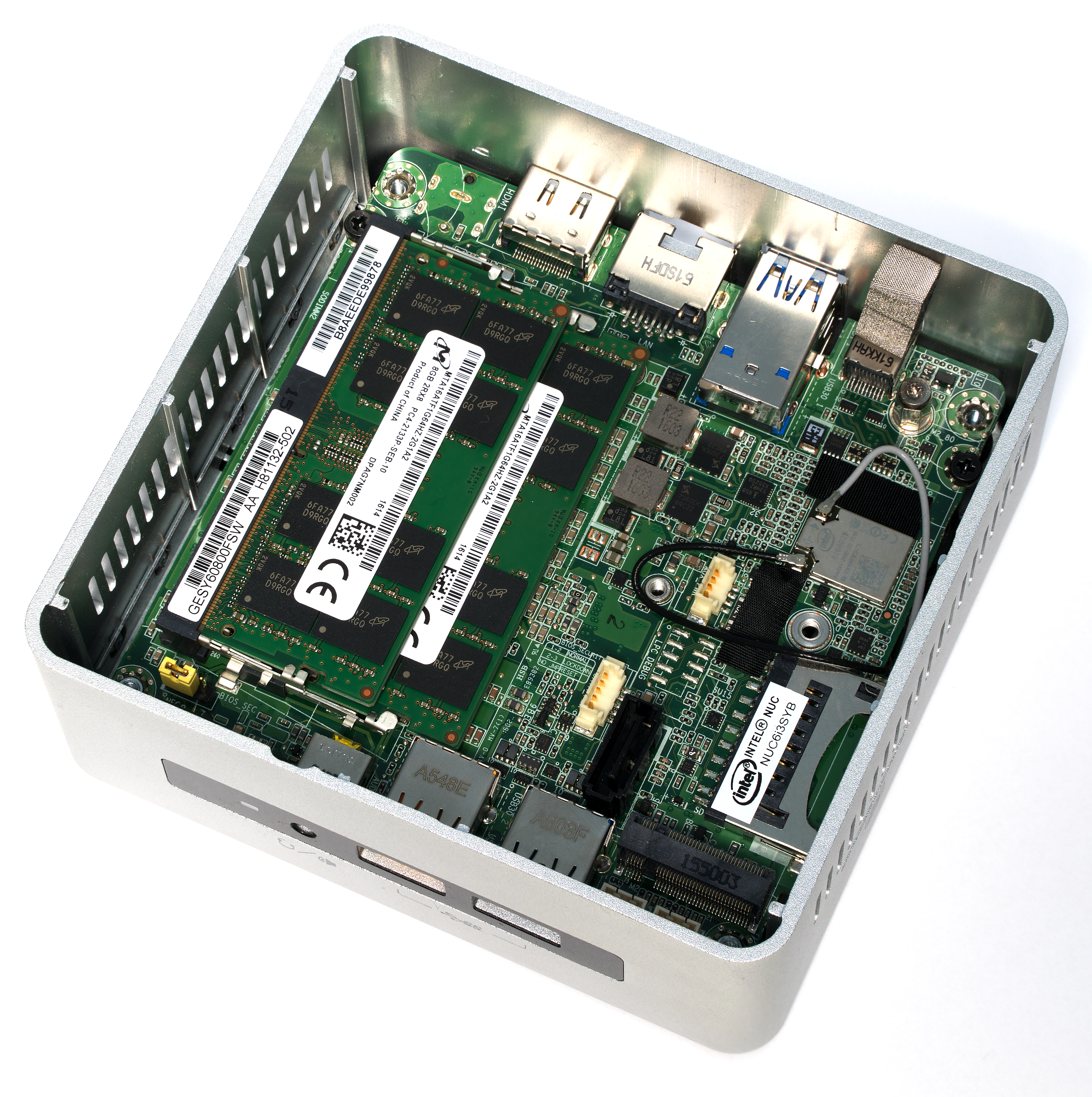
Motherboard of a 6th generation NUC (Model NUC6i3SYH), extended with two 8 GB RAM modules

Next Unit of Computing (NUC) is a line of small-form-factor barebone computer kits designed by Intel. Previewed in 2012 and launched in early 2013, the NUC line continues to develop over generations of Intel-based CPU launches, spanning from Sandy Bridge-based Celeron CPUs in the first generation, to Raptor Lake-based mobile and desktop CPUs in the thirteenth, and more recently Meteor Lake-based processors with AI capabilities.

The standard barebone kits consist of the NUC board, in a plastic case with a fan, an external power supply, and a VESA mounting plate. The plastic case is typically offered on one of two chassis, Tall (allowing for a 2.5" drive bay) or Slim (no 2.5" drive bay). The NUC motherboard measures approximately 10 × 10 centimetres (4 × 4 in), although some models have had different dimensions. Intel also sells bare NUC motherboards, which have built-in CPUs.

In July 2023, Intel announced that it would no longer develop NUC mainboards and matching mini PCs. They subsequently announced that NUC products would continue to be—and since that time have been—manufactured, sold and supported by ASUS under a non-exclusive license.

== First generation ==
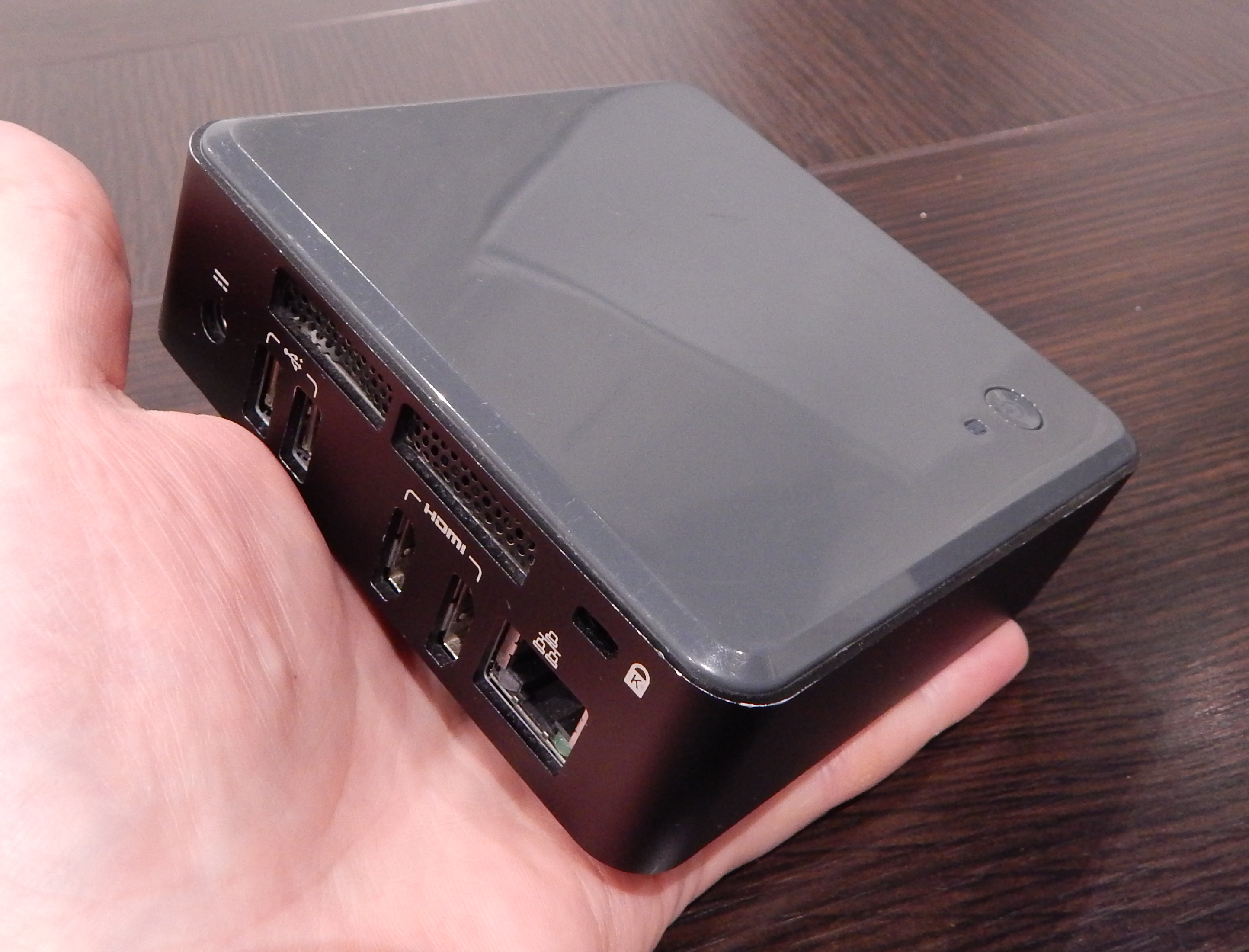
Intel NUC DCCP847DYE

=== Sandy Bridge ===
The first generation Intel NUC launched in the first quarter of 2013. This UCFF motherboard and system kit are codenamed Ski Lake (DCP847SK) and Deep Canyon (DCCP847DY) respectively.

First generation kits
| Model | Board | Processor | TDP | GPU | Max RAM | Display | External USB ports | Networking |
|---|---|---|---|---|---|---|---|---|
| DCCP847DYE | DCP847SKE | Celeron 847 | 17 W | HD Graphics 2000 | 16 GB | HDMI 1.4a (×2) | USB 2.0 (×3) | Gigabit Ethernet (×1) |

== Second generation ==
=== Ivy Bridge ===
The base UCFF motherboard and kit without Thunderbolt or USB 3 are codenamed Golden Lake (D33217GK) and Ice Canyon (DC3217IY) respectively. The Thunderbolt capable UCFF motherboard and kit are codenamed Campers Lake (D33217CK) and Box Canyon (DC3217BY) respectively. The USB 3 capable UCFF motherboard and kit are codenamed Rend Lake (D53427RK) and Horse Canyon (DC53427HY) respectively.

The stripped-down DC3217BY model has a signature red top cover and no Ethernet. This model, while stocks were still available, generally sold for a deep discount. The absence of Ethernet may be mitigated by using a USB 2.0 to 10/100 fast Ethernet dongle based upon the Kawasaki LSI one-chip adapter (KL5KUSB102, for example), or a similar dongle based upon a Realtek chip; the Kawasaki Logic dongle requires a proprietary driver for macOS X, whereas the driver for the Realtek dongle is built into macOS X. The DC3217BY runs macOS X (10.9, and any of its updates) flawlessly as the processor's HD4000 is fully supported by macOS X.

Second generation kits
| Model | Board | Processor | TDP | GPU | Max RAM | Display | External USB ports | Networking |
|---|---|---|---|---|---|---|---|---|
| DC3217IYE | D33217GK | Core i3-3217U | 17 W | HD Graphics 4000 | 16 GB | HDMI 1.4a (×2) | USB 2.0 (×3) | Gigabit Ethernet (×1) |
| DC3217BY | D33217CK | Core i3-3217U | 17 W | HD Graphics 4000 | 16 GB | HDMI 1.4a (×1); Thunderbolt via mDP 1.1a (×1) | USB 2.0 (×3) | —N/a |
| DC53427HYE | D53427RKE | Core i5-3427U | 17 W | HD Graphics 4000 | 16 GB | HDMI 1.4a (×1); mDP 1.1a (×2) | USB 2.0 (×2); USB 3.0 (×1) | Gigabit Ethernet (×1) |

== Third generation ==
=== Bay Trail-M ===
This UCFF motherboard (DN2820FYB) and system kit (DN2820FYKH) model were codenamed Forest Canyon. The DN2820FYKH product itself is mis-marked DN2820FYK, but the retail package, all retail documentation, and Intel's web site correctly identify this product as DN2820FYKH. The "H" indicates support for internal 2.5" media, SSD or HDD. There is no "non-H" version of this product as it does not include an on-board mSATA connector, hence media which is external to the board is mandatory, and hence the "H" version.

This product introduced a new 12V 3A "wall wart" power supply in place of the previous 19V 3.42A laptop-style power brick and its IEC 60320-C5 "Mickey Mouse" type AC power cord. Four region-specific plug-on adapters, including North America and three overseas countries, are included in the retail package.

These models shipped with the problematic BIOS revision 13, however this revision did not recognise most low voltage SO-DIMMs and would report as having zero capacity. Keyboard escapes for BIOS interfacing had been problematic, legacy booting was not supported, and it had been elected to only include UEFI booting. BIOS revision 48 has been released and resolved the problems, enabling the recognition of most low voltage SO-DIMMs, keyboard escapes and legacy booting.

Forest Canyon kits
| Model | Board | Processor | TDP | GPU | Max RAM | Display | External USB ports | Networking | Internal 2.5 SATA |
|---|---|---|---|---|---|---|---|---|---|
| DN2820FYKH | DN2820FYB | Celeron N2820 (-101) or Celeron N2830 (-103) | 7.5 W | HD Graphics | 8 GB | HDMI 1.4a | USB 2.0 (×2); USB 3.0 (×1) | Gigabit Ethernet (×1); Wi-Fi 802.11bgn, Bluetooth 4.0 | Yes (×1) |

=== Bay Trail-I ===
This UCFF motherboard (DE3815TYB) and system kit (DE3815TYK) models were codenamed Thin Canyon. This is a fanless system with a larger case than previous NUCs (7.5" x 4.6" x 1.6".) The board remains 4" x 4".

Thin Canyon kits
| Model | Board | Processor | TDP | GPU | Max RAM | Display | External USB ports | Networking | Internal 2.5 SATA |
|---|---|---|---|---|---|---|---|---|---|
| DE3815TYKHE | DE3815TYBE | Atom E3815 | 5 W | HD Graphics | 8 GB | HDMI, VGA, embedded DisplayPort | USB 2.0 (×2); USB 3.0 (×1) | Gigabit Ethernet (×1) | Yes (×1) |

== Fourth generation ==
=== Haswell ===
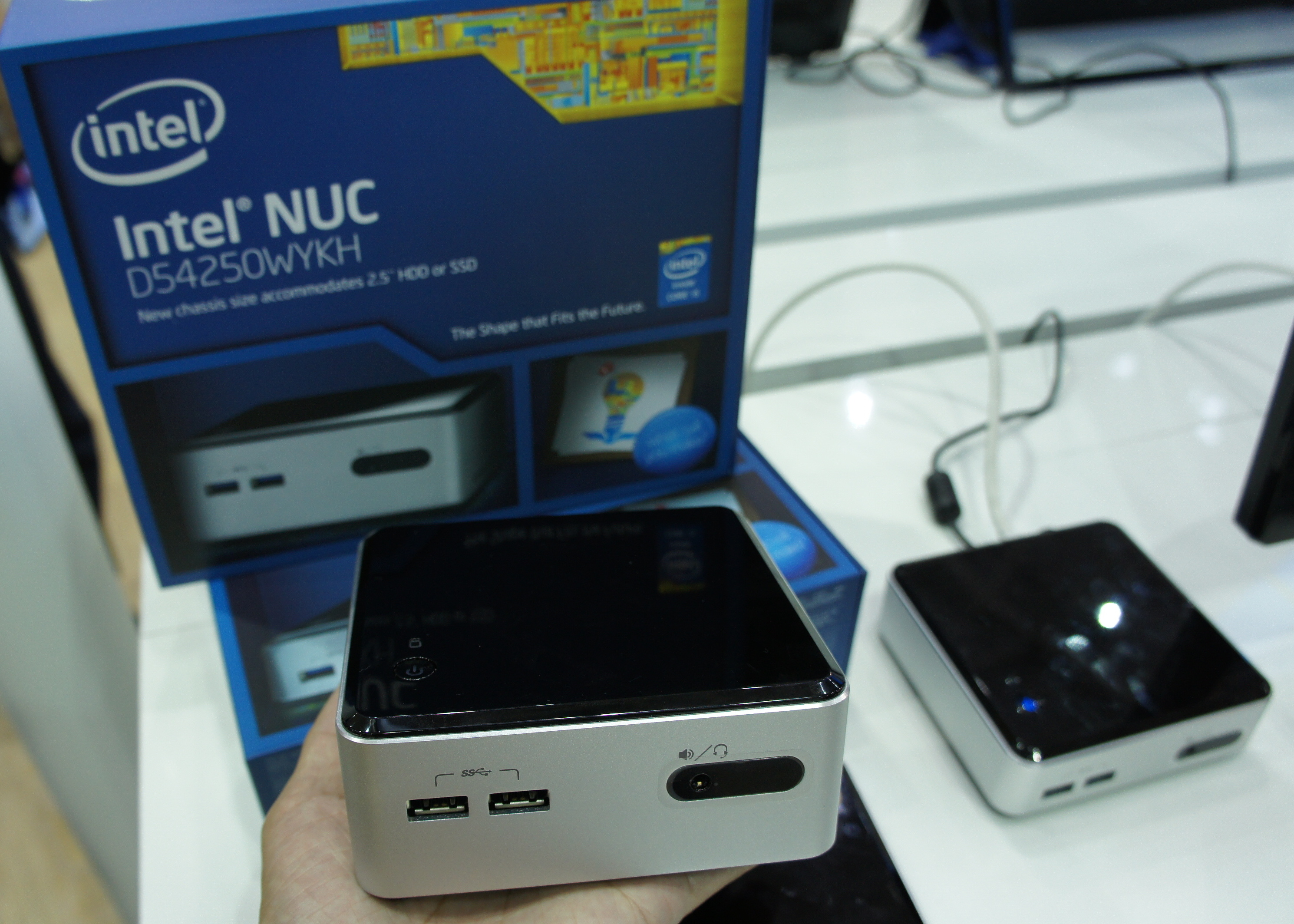
Intel NUC D54250WYKH

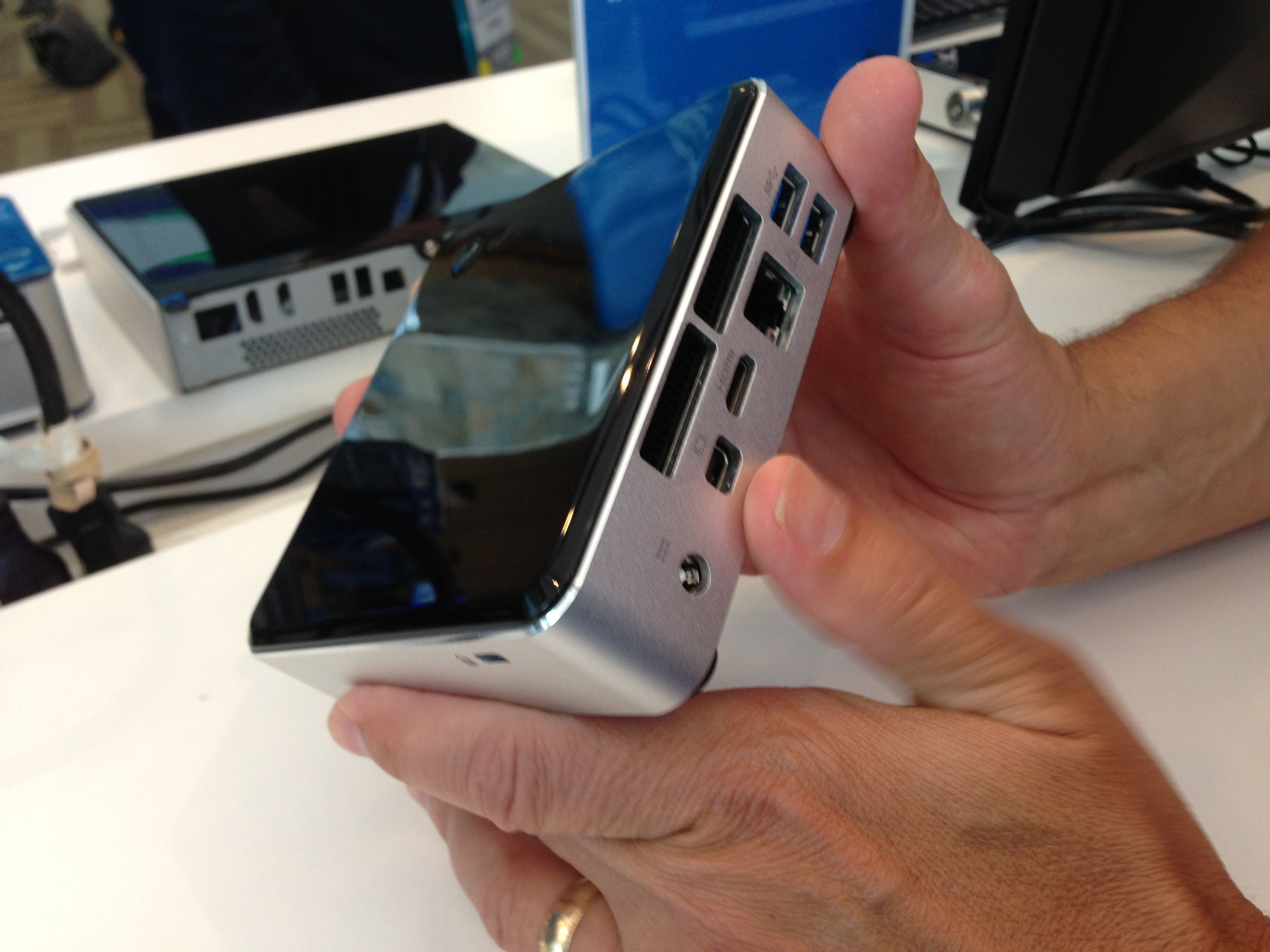
Haswell-based Wilson Canyon Intel NUC, rear panel

UCFF motherboard (D34010WYB and D54250WYB) and system kit (D34010WYK/D34010WYKH and D54250WYK/D54250WYKH) models were designated Wilson Canyon containing Haswell processors were revealed in June 2013. In recent years, Intel NUC models beyond the fourth generation have focused heavily on performance per watt and modular upgrade options. Later designs included support for Thunderbolt 4, DDR5 memory, and PCIe Gen 5 storage, reflecting the trend toward compact yet powerful workstation-grade systems.

Wilson Canyon kits
| Model | Board | Processor | TDP | GPU | Max RAM | Display | External USB ports | Networking | Internal 2.5 SATA |
|---|---|---|---|---|---|---|---|---|---|
| D34010WYK | D34010WYB | Core i3-4010U | 15 W | HD Graphics 4400 | 16 GB | Mini HDMI 1.4a and mDP 1.2 | USB 3.0 (×4) | Gigabit Ethernet (×1) | Partial |
| D34010WYKH | D34010WYB | Core i3-4010U | 15 W | HD Graphics 4400 | 16 GB | Mini HDMI 1.4a and mDP 1.2 | USB 3.0 (×4) | Gigabit Ethernet (×1) | Yes (×1) |
| D54250WYK | D54250WYB | Core i5-4250U | 15 W | HD Graphics 5000 | 16 GB | Mini HDMI 1.4a and mDP 1.2 | USB 3.0 (×4) | Gigabit Ethernet (×1) | Partial |
| D54250WYKH | D54250WYB | Core i5-4250U | 15 W | HD Graphics 5000 | 16 GB | Mini HDMI 1.4a and mDP 1.2 | USB 3.0 (×4) | Gigabit Ethernet (×1) | Yes (×1) |

== Fifth generation ==
=== Broadwell-U ===
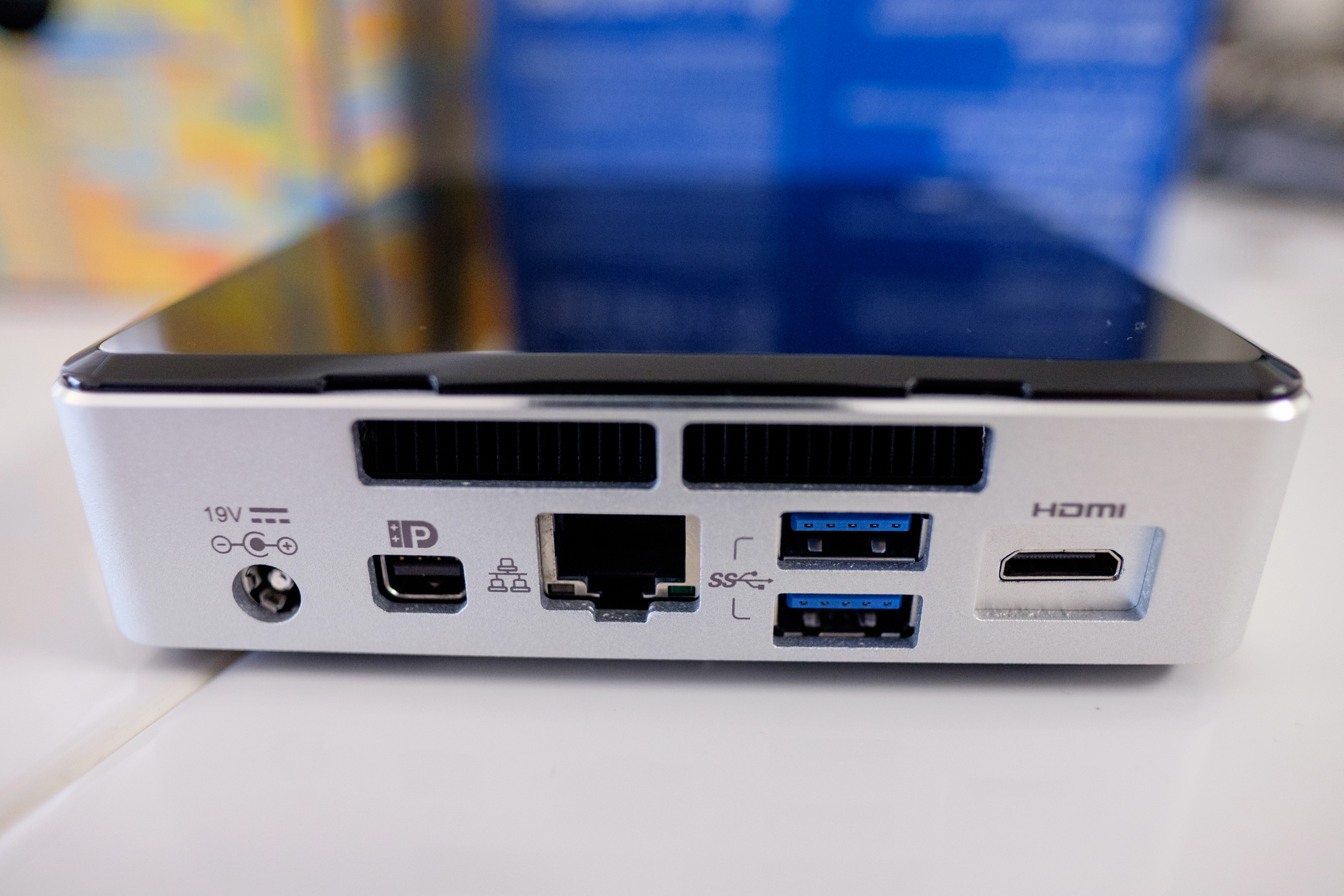
Intel NUC5i3RYK

In early 2015 a new generation of NUCs, powered by 5th generation Intel processors was released and in Q2 2015 the first NUC with Core i7 processor (NUC5i7RYH) became available. The collection of 5th generation of NUCs include adaptive/smart performance technology and Turbo Boost Technology 2.0.

UCFF motherboard (NUC5i3RYB, NUC5i5RYB and NUC5i7RYB) and system kit (NUC5i5RYK/NUC5i3RYH, NUC5i5RYK/NUC5i5RYH and NUC5i7RYH) models were designated Rock Canyon. UCFF motherboard (NUC5i3MYBE and NUC5i5MYBE) and system kit (NUC5i3MYHE and NUC5i5MYHE) models were codenamed Maple Canyon. In Q4 2018 and Q1 2019 two new SKUs of "Rock Canyon" - Refresh have been launched and become two of a few available models still supporting Windows* 7 (NUC5i3RYHSN and NUC5i5RYHS). These modes have updated CPU revisions and other minor changes. All models include:

- Dual-channel DDR3L SO-DIMM, 1.35 V, 1333/1600 MHz, 16 GB maximum
- One Gigabit Ethernet port
- Internal support for M.2 (either B-Keyed Maple Canyon or M-Keyed Rock Canyon) 22×42, 22×60, and 22×80 SSD card supporting PCIe 2.0 (×1, ×2 and ×4) and SATA 6 Gbit/s
- Two USB 3.0 connectors on back panel
- Two USB 3.0 connectors on front panel
- Two internal USB 2.0 ports via header
- Up to 7.1 surround audio via mini HDMI and mini DisplayPort
- Headphone/microphone jack on the front panel

Rock Canyon kits
| Model | Board | CPU | TDP | GPU | Mini HDMI^{1} | Mini DisplayPort^{2} | eDP | Wireless connectivity | 2.5" SATA3 bay | Charging port | Infrared sensor |
|---|---|---|---|---|---|---|---|---|---|---|---|
| NUC5i7RYH | NUC5i7RYB | i7-5557U | 28 W | Iris 6100 | Yes | Yes | No | IEEE 802.11ac, Bluetooth 4.0, Intel Wireless Display | Yes | Yes | Yes |
| NUC5i5RYH | NUC5i5RYB | i5-5250U | 15 W | HD 6000 | Yes | Yes | No | IEEE 802.11ac, Bluetooth 4.0, Intel Wireless Display | Yes | Yes | Yes |
| NUC5i5RYK | NUC5i5RYB | i5-5250U | 15 W | HD 6000 | Yes | Yes | No | IEEE 802.11ac, Bluetooth 4.0, Intel Wireless Display | No | Yes | Yes |
| NUC5i3RYH | NUC5i3RYB | i3-5010U | 15 W | HD 5500 | Yes | Yes | No | IEEE 802.11ac, Bluetooth 4.0, Intel Wireless Display | Yes | Yes | Yes |
| NUC5i3RYK | NUC5i3RYB | i3-5010U | 15 W | HD 5500 | Yes | Yes | No | IEEE 802.11ac, Bluetooth 4.0, Intel Wireless Display | No | Yes | Yes |

Maple Canyon kits
| Model | Board | CPU | TDP | GPU | Mini HDMI^{1} | Mini DisplayPort^{2} | eDP | Wireless connectivity | 2.5" SATA3 bay | Charging port | Infrared sensor |
|---|---|---|---|---|---|---|---|---|---|---|---|
| NUC5i3MYHE | NUC5i3MYBE | i3-5010U | 15 W | HD 5500 | No | Yes (×2) | Yes | M.2 E-Keyed 22×30 wireless card slot | Yes | No | No |
| NUC5i5MYHE | NUC5i5MYBE | i5-5300U | 15 W | HD 5500 | No | Yes (×2) | Yes | M.2 E-Keyed 22×30 wireless card slot | Yes | No | No |

1. Version 1.4a
2. Version 1.2

=== Braswell ===
These UCFF system kit (NUC5CPYH and NUC5PPYH) models, formerly known as Pinnacle Canyon, are based on 5th generation Celeron and Pentium-branded Braswell 14 nm processor family. There is also the UCFF complete system (NUC5PGYH) model, formerly known as Grass Canyon, which is based on 5th generation Pentium-branded Braswell 14 nm processor family and comes with 2 GB of RAM and 32 GB of eMMC with Windows 10 installed.

All models include:

- One memory channel DDR3L SO-DIMM (204-pin), 1.35 V, 1333/1600 MHz, 8 GB maximum
- One Gigabit Ethernet port
- 802.11ac Wi-Fi (Intel Wireless-AC 3165) and Bluetooth 4.0
- Internal support for M.2 (E-Keyed) 22×30 wireless card supporting PCIe 2.0 ×1, and USB 2.0
- Two USB 3.0 connectors on back panel
- Two USB 3.0 connectors on front panel
- Two internal USB 2.0 ports via header
- Up to 7.1 surround audio via HDMI
- Headphone/microphone jack on the front panel
- Headphone/TOSLINK jack on the rear panel
- SDXC slot with UHS-I support on the side
- CIR Sensor
- According to the Intel Technical Product Specification, these models have fans.

Pinnacle Canyon kits
| Model | Board | Processor | TDP | GPU | Max RAM | Display | External USB ports | Networking | Internal 2.5 SATA |
|---|---|---|---|---|---|---|---|---|---|
| NUC5CPYH | NUC5CPYB | Celeron N3050 or N3060 | 6 W | HD Graphics (12 EU) | 8 GB | HDMI 1.4, VGA | USB 3.0 (×4) | Gigabit Ethernet (×1), 802.11ac, Bluetooth 4.0 | Yes (×1) |
| NUC5PPYH | NUC5PPYB | Pentium N3700 | 6 W | HD Graphics (16 EU) | 8 GB | HDMI 1.4, VGA | USB 3.0 (×4) | Gigabit Ethernet (×1), 802.11ac, Bluetooth 4.0 | Yes (×1) |

Grass Canyon kits
| Model | Board | Processor | TDP | GPU | Max RAM | Display | External USB ports | Networking | Internal 2.5 SATA |
|---|---|---|---|---|---|---|---|---|---|
| NUC5PGYH | NUC5PGYH | Pentium N3700 | 6 W | HD Graphics (16 EU) | 8 GB | HDMI 1.4, VGA | USB 3.0 (×4) | Gigabit Ethernet (×1), 802.11ac, Bluetooth 4.0 | Yes (×1) |

== Sixth generation ==
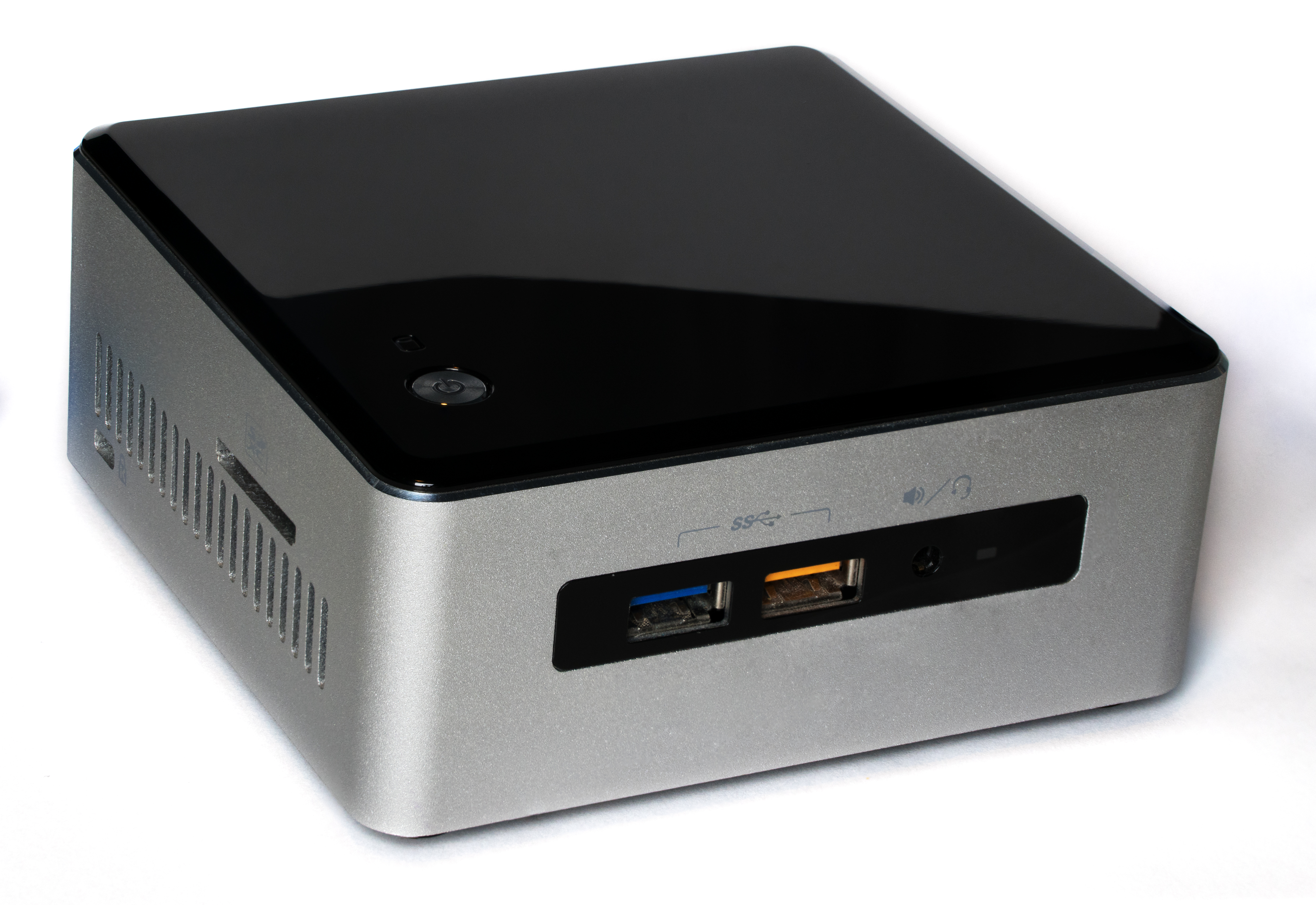
Skylake-based Swift Canyon Intel NUC (NUC6i3SYH)

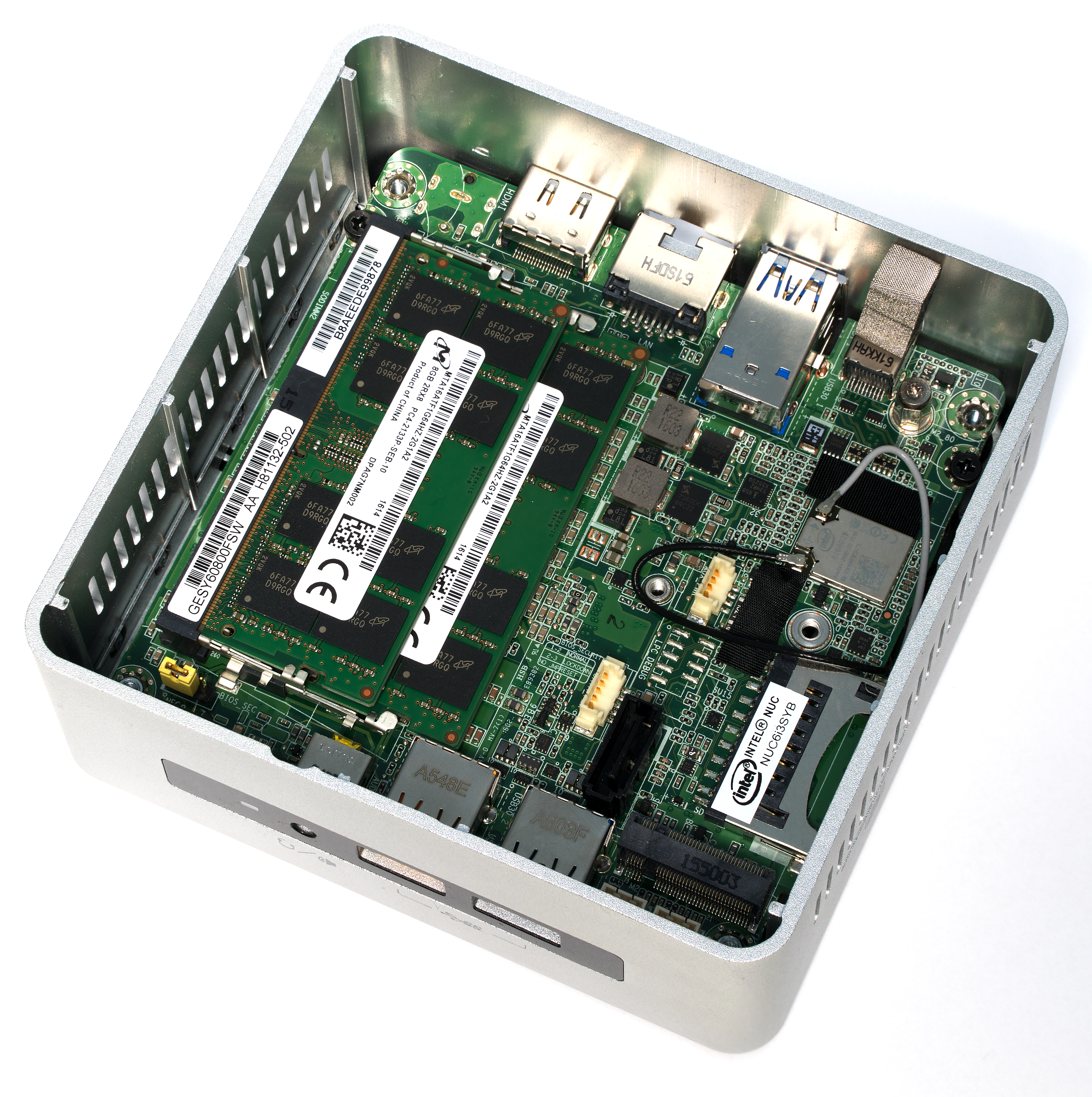
Opened Skylake-based Swift Canyon Intel NUC (NUC6i3SYH)

=== Skylake-U ===
UCFF system kit (NUC6i3SYK/NUC6i3SYH and NUC6i5SYK/NUC6i5SYH) models were designated Swift Canyon, containing Skylake processors. UCFF system kit (NUC6i7KYK) models were codenamed Skull Canyon, containing Skylake processors. They were launched in Q4/2015, except for NUC6i7KYK, which was launched in Q2/2016.

All models include:

- Dual-channel DDR4 SO-DIMM, 1.2 V, 2133 MHz, 32 GB maximum
- One Gigabit Ethernet port
- Intel Dual Band Wireless-AC 8260 (802.11ac), 1×1, up to 867 Mbit/s
- Dual-mode Bluetooth 4.1
- Internal support for M.2 M-Keyed 22×42 and 22×80 SSD card supporting PCIe 3.0 (×1, ×2 and ×4) and SATA 6 Gbit/s
- SDXC slot with UHS-I support on the side
- Intel HD Graphics 540 video (Iris Pro Graphics 580 for the NUC6i7KYK)
- Up to 7.1 surround audio via full-sized HDMI and mini DisplayPort
- Intel Wireless Display (Intel WiDi)

Skull Canyon models include:

- A larger case (8.3 by 4.6 by 1.1 inches) than typical NUCs.
- USB-C port supporting USB 10Gbps, Thunderbolt 3 and DisplayPort 1.2
- Internal support for a second M.2 M-Keyed 22×42 and 22×80 SSD card supporting PCIe 3.0 (×1, ×2 and ×4) and SATA 6 Gbit/s

Swift Canyon kits
| Model | Board | Processor | TDP | GPU | Max RAM | Display | External USB ports | Networking | Internal 2.5 SATA |
|---|---|---|---|---|---|---|---|---|---|
| NUC6i3SYK | NUC6i3SYB | Core i3-6100U | 15 W | HD Graphics 520 | 32 GB | HDMI 1.4b and mDP 1.2 | USB 3.0 (×4) | Gigabit Ethernet (×1) | Partial |
| NUC6i3SYH | NUC6i3SYB | Core i3-6100U | 15 W | HD Graphics 520 | 32 GB | HDMI 1.4b and mDP 1.2 | USB 3.0 (×4) | Gigabit Ethernet (×1) | Yes (×1) |
| NUC6i5SYK | NUC6i5SYB | Core i5-6260U | 15 W | Iris Graphics 540 | 32 GB | HDMI 1.4b and mDP 1.2 | USB 3.0 (×4) | Gigabit Ethernet (×1) | Partial |
| NUC6i5SYH | NUC6i5SYB | Core i5-6260U | 15 W | Iris Graphics 540 | 32 GB | HDMI 1.4b and mDP 1.2 | USB 3.0 (×4) | Gigabit Ethernet (×1) | Yes (×1) |

Skull Canyon kits
| Kit | Processor | TDP | GPU | Max RAM | Display | External USB ports | Networking | Internal 2.5 SATA |
|---|---|---|---|---|---|---|---|---|
| NUC6i7KYK | Core i7-6770HQ | 45 W | Iris Pro Graphics 580 | 32 GB | HDMI 2.0, mDP 1.2 and DP 1.2 via USB-C | USB 5Gbps (×4) and USB 10Gbps (×1) | Gigabit Ethernet (×1) | —N/a |

=== Apollo Lake ===
These UCFF system kit (NUC6CAYS and NUC6CAYH) models formerly known as Arches Canyon, are based on the 6th generation Celeron-branded Apollo Lake SoC 14 nm processor family. The main difference between the two systems are that NUC6CAYS adds 32 GB of eMMC storage. They were launched in Q4/2016.

- RAM: DDR3L-1600/1866 1.35V SO-DIMM

Intel Apollo Lake processors lack AVX (Advanced Vector Extensions) support.

Apollo Lake, introduced in 2016 for entry-level desktops, laptops, and embedded systems, is based on the Goldmont microarchitecture. Intel deliberately omitted AVX, AVX2, and even the older SSE4.2 instructions from this lineup to reduce power consumption and die size for low-cost devices.

The vector instruction support on Apollo Lake is limited to:

- **SSE3**
- **SSSE3**
- **SSE4.1**

Because AVX is completely absent, software compiled specifically for AVX instruction sets will not run on these processors without recompilation or emulation (which is often too slow to be practical). This is a common point of confusion, as many slightly newer or higher-end Intel chips (like Kaby Lake or Coffee Lake) do support AVX.

Arches Canyon kits
| Model | Board | Processor | TDP | GPU | Max RAM | Display | External USB ports | Networking | Internal 2.5 SATA |
|---|---|---|---|---|---|---|---|---|---|
| NUC6CAYH | NUC6CAYB | Celeron J3455 | 10 W | HD Graphics 500 (12 EU) | 8 GB | HDMI 2.0, VGA | USB 3.0 (×4) | Gigabit Ethernet (×1), 802.11ac, Bluetooth 4.0 | Yes (×1) |
| NUC6CAYS | NUC6CAYB | Celeron J3455 | 10 W | HD Graphics 500 (12 EU) | 8 GB | HDMI 2.0, VGA | USB 3.0 (×4) | Gigabit Ethernet (×1), 802.11ac, Bluetooth 4.0 | Yes (×1) |

== Seventh generation ==
=== Kaby Lake-U (Baby Canyon) ===
Intel seventh generation NUC models, codenamed Baby Canyon, are based on their Kaby Lake-U processors. They were launched in Q1/2017 and Q2/2017.

Baby Canyon kits
| Model | Board | Processor | TDP | GPU | Max RAM | Display | External USB ports | Networking | Internal 2.5 SATA | Internal M.2 slots | Intel Optane M.2 module |
|---|---|---|---|---|---|---|---|---|---|---|---|
| NUC7i7BNH | NUC7i7BNB | i7-7567U | 28 W | Iris Plus 650 | 32 GB | HDMI 2.0a, Thunderbolt 3 via USB-C | USB 3.0 (×4), USB 10Gbps (×1) | Gigabit Ethernet (×1), 802.11ac, Bluetooth 4.2 | Yes (×1) | Yes (×1) | No |
| NUC7i7BNHX1 | NUC7i7BNB | i7-7567U | 28 W | Iris Plus 650 | 32 GB | HDMI 2.0a, Thunderbolt 3 via USB-C | USB 3.0 (×4), USB 10Gbps (×1) | Gigabit Ethernet (×1), 802.11ac, Bluetooth 4.2 | Yes (×1) | Yes (×1) | Yes (16 GB) |
| NUC7i5BNH | NUC7i5BNB | i5-7260U | 15 W | Iris Plus 640 | 32 GB | HDMI 2.0a, Thunderbolt 3 via USB-C | USB 3.0 (×4), USB 10Gbps (×1) | Gigabit Ethernet (×1), 802.11ac, Bluetooth 4.2 | Yes (×1) | Yes (×1) | No |
| NUC7i5BNHX1 | NUC7i5BNB | i5-7260U | 15 W | Iris Plus 640 | 32 GB | HDMI 2.0a, Thunderbolt 3 via USB-C | USB 3.0 (×4), USB 10Gbps (×1) | Gigabit Ethernet (×1), 802.11ac, Bluetooth 4.2 | Yes (×1) | Yes (×1) | Yes (16 GB) |
| NUC7i5BNK | NUC7i5BNB | i5-7260U | 15 W | Iris Plus 640 | 32 GB | HDMI 2.0a, Thunderbolt 3 via USB-C | USB 3.0 (×4), USB 10Gbps (×1) | Gigabit Ethernet (×1), 802.11ac, Bluetooth 4.2 | No | Yes (×1) | No |
| NUC7i3BNH | NUC7i3BNB | i3-7100U | 15 W | HD Graphics 620 | 32 GB | HDMI 2.0a, DP 1.2 via USB-C | USB 3.0 (×4), USB 10Gbps (×1) | Gigabit Ethernet (×1), 802.11ac, Bluetooth 4.2 | Yes (×1) | Yes (×1) | No |
| NUC7i3BNHX1 | NUC7i3BNB | i3-7100U | 15 W | HD Graphics 620 | 32 GB | HDMI 2.0a, DP 1.2 via USB-C | USB 3.0 (×4), USB 10Gbps (×1) | Gigabit Ethernet (×1), 802.11ac, Bluetooth 4.2 | Yes (×1) | Yes (×1) | Yes (16 GB) |
| NUC7i3BNK | NUC7i3BNB | i3-7100U | 15 W | HD Graphics 620 | 32 GB | HDMI 2.0a, DP 1.2 via USB-C | USB 3.0 (×4), USB 10Gbps (×1) | Gigabit Ethernet (×1), 802.11ac, Bluetooth 4.2 | No | Yes (×1) | No |

=== Kaby Lake-U (Dawson Canyon) ===
A refresh of the seventh generation NUC models, codenamed Dawson Canyon, saw a replacement of the USB 5Gbps Type-C port with a second HDMI 2.0a port. This refresh also updated the CPU's in the i5 models while still using Kaby Lake-U processors, and the i7 models to Kaby Lake-R processors. The i3 models saw no change in the CPU. Intel Optane M.2 support remains, but no models with a preinstalled module were released. M.2 support was updated from a single 22×42/80 slot to dual 22×30 (key E) and 22×80 (key M) slots. They were launched in Q2/2017.

Dawson Canyon Kaby Lake-U kits
| Model | Processor | TDP | GPU | Max RAM | Display | External USB ports | Networking | Internal 2.5 SATA | Internal M.2 slots | Intel Optane M.2 module |
|---|---|---|---|---|---|---|---|---|---|---|
| NUC7i5DNHE | i5-7300U | 15 W | HD Graphics 620 | 32 GB | HDMI 2.0a (×2) | USB 3.0 (×4) | Gigabit Ethernet (×1), 802.11ac, Bluetooth 4.2 | Yes (×1) | Yes (×2) | No |
| NUC7i5DNKE | i5-7300U | 15 W | HD Graphics 620 | 32 GB | HDMI 2.0a (×2) | USB 3.0 (×4) | Gigabit Ethernet (×1), 802.11ac, Bluetooth 4.2 | No | Yes (×2) | No |
| NUC7i3DNHE | i3-7100U | 15 W | HD Graphics 620 | 32 GB | HDMI 2.0a (×2) | USB 3.0 (×4) | Gigabit Ethernet (×1), 802.11ac, Bluetooth 4.2 | Yes (×1) | Yes (×2) | No |
| NUC7i3DNKE | i3-7100U | 15 W | HD Graphics 620 | 32 GB | HDMI 2.0a (×2) | USB 3.0 (×4) | Gigabit Ethernet (×1), 802.11ac, Bluetooth 4.2 | No | Yes (×2) | No |

=== Kaby Lake-R (Dawson Canyon) ===
They were launched in Q1/2018.

Dawson Canyon Kaby Lake-R kits
| Model | Processor | TDP | GPU | Max RAM | Display | External USB ports | Networking | Internal 2.5 SATA | Internal M.2 slots | Intel Optane M.2 module |
|---|---|---|---|---|---|---|---|---|---|---|
| NUC7i7DNHE | i7-8650U | 15 W | UHD Graphics 620 | 32 GB | HDMI 2.0a (×2) | USB 3.0 (×4) | Gigabit Ethernet (×1), 802.11ac, Bluetooth 4.2 | Yes (×1) | Yes (×2) | No |
| NUC7i7DNKE | i7-8650U | 15 W | UHD Graphics 620 | 32 GB | HDMI 2.0a (×2) | USB 3.0 (×4) | Gigabit Ethernet (×1), 802.11ac, Bluetooth 4.2 | No | Yes (×2) | No |

=== Dawson Canyon Fanless (Kaby Lake) ===
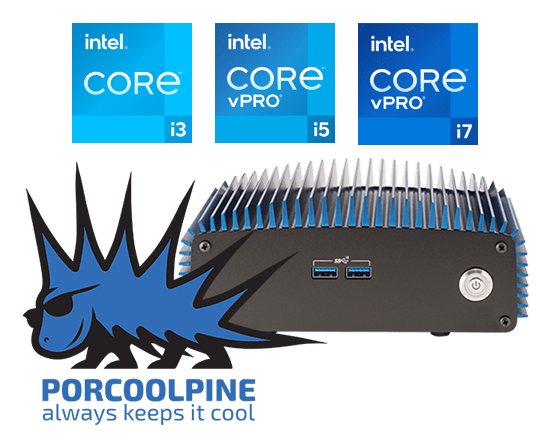
Simply NUC's Porcoolpine Mascot Image and Intel Badges

A Fanless chassis was designed by Simply NUC, Inc. of Round Rock, Texas for the Dawson Canyon motherboards.

This fanless version of the product was marketed as "Porcoolpine™" They were launched in Q2/2018.

The non-vPro Core i3, along with the vPro Core i5 and i7 were supported.

| Model | Processor | TDP | GPU | Max RAM | Display | External USB ports | Networking | Internal 2.5 SATA | Internal M.2 slots | Intel Optane M.2 module |
|---|---|---|---|---|---|---|---|---|---|---|
| NUC7i7DNFE | i7-8650U | 15 W | HD Graphics 620 | 32 GB | HDMI 2.0a (×2) | USB 3.0 (×4) | Gigabit Ethernet (×1), 802.11ac, Bluetooth 4.2 | Yes (×1) | Yes (×2) | No |
| NUC7i5DNFE | i5-7300U | 15 W | HD Graphics 620 | 32 GB | HDMI 2.0a (×2) | USB 3.0 (×4) | Gigabit Ethernet (×1), 802.11ac, Bluetooth 4.2 | Yes (×1) | Yes (×2) | No |
| NUC7i3DNFE | i3-7100U | 15 W | HD Graphics 620 | 32 GB | HDMI 2.0a (×2) | USB 3.0 (×4) | Gigabit Ethernet (×1), 802.11ac, Bluetooth 4.2 | Yes (×1) | Yes (×2) | No |

Note: NUC7i7DNFE was sometimes referred to as NUC8i7DNFE due to using a Gen 8 Kaby Lake Refresh processor

=== Gemini Lake (June Canyon) ===
The UCFF system kit (NUC7PJYH and NUC7CJYH) models, codenamed June Canyon, based on 7th generation Pentium & Celeron-branded Gemini Lake SoC 14 nm processor family. They were launched in Q1/2018.

RAM: DDR4-2400 1.2V SO-DIMM.

Officially as stated in intel ark for NUC7PJYH model max memory size is 8 GB. There have been reports of "over-ramming" to 16 GB, 24 GB or 32 GB without any problems while running in 24x7 environments. Max memory supported stated in BIOS dmidecode is:

 Handle 0x0018, DMI type 16, 23 bytes
 Physical Memory Array
       Location: System Board Or Motherboard
       Use: System Memory
       Error Correction Type: None
       Maximum Capacity: 32 GB
       Error Information Handle: Not Provided
       Number Of Devices: 2

June Canyon kits
| Model | Processor | TDP | GPU | Max RAM | Display | External USB ports | Networking | Internal 2.5 SATA |
|---|---|---|---|---|---|---|---|---|
| NUC7PJYH | Pentium Silver J5005 | 10 W | UHD Graphics 605 (18 EU) | 8 GB (32GB Unofficially*) | HDMI 2.0 × 2 | USB 3.0 (×4) | Gigabit Ethernet (×1), 802.11ac, Bluetooth 5.0 | Yes (×1) |
| NUC7CJYH | Celeron J4005 | 10 W | UHD Graphics 600 (12 EU) | 8 GB | HDMI 2.0 × 2 | USB 3.0 (×4) | Gigabit Ethernet (×1), 802.11ac, Bluetooth 5.0 | Yes (×1) |

== Eighth generation ==
=== Kaby Lake-G ===
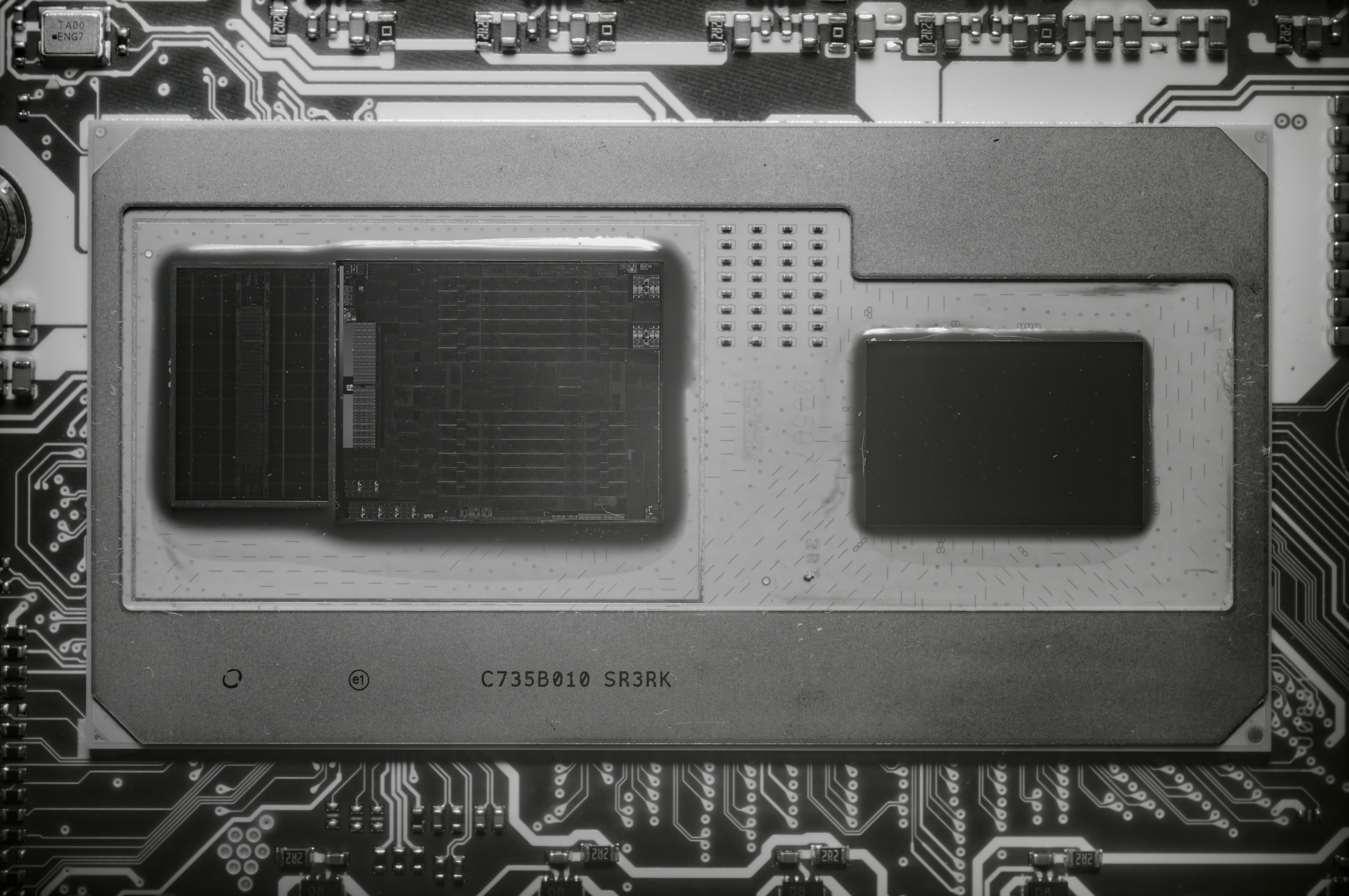
Kaby Lake-G: i7-8705G processor (infrared)

Intel eighth generation NUC models, codenamed Hades Canyon, were based on their Kaby Lake-G processors with a TDP from 65 W to 100 W. This unusual processor was a multi-chip package, containing an Intel Kaby Lake H CPU, a custom AMD Radeon GPU, based on Vega and Polaris technologies, and 4 GB of HBM2 memory. The HBM2 memory was stacked and connected to the GPU via an embedded multi-die interconnect bridge (EMIB), a small silicon interposer embedded in the package.

Hades Canyon was launched in Q1/2018. These NUCs had an unusually large 1.2-liter case (22 x 14 x 4 cm.)

Hades Canyon kits
| Model | Processor | TDP | GPU | Max RAM | Display | External USB ports | Networking | Internal 2.5 SATA | Internal M.2 slots |
|---|---|---|---|---|---|---|---|---|---|
| NUC8i7HNK | i7‑8705G | 65 W | HD Graphics 630 and Radeon RX Vega M GL | 32 GB | HDMI 2.0b (×2), mDP 1.2 (×2) and DP 1.2 via USB-C port (×2) (Thunderbolt 3) | USB 5Gbps Type-A (×5), USB 10Gbps Type-C (×1) and USB 10Gbps Type-A (×1) | Gigabit Ethernet (×2), 802.11ac and Bluetooth 4.2 | No | Yes (×2) |
| NUC8i7HVK | i7‑8809G | 100 W | HD Graphics 630 and Radeon RX Vega M GH | 32 GB | HDMI 2.0b (×2), mDP 1.2 (×2) and DP 1.2 via USB-C port (×2) (Thunderbolt 3) | USB 5Gbps Type-A (×5), USB 10Gbps Type-C (×1) and USB 10Gbps Type-A (×1) | Gigabit Ethernet (×2), 802.11ac and Bluetooth 4.2 | No | Yes (×2) |

=== Coffee Lake-U ===
Intel eighth generation NUC models, codenamed Bean Canyon, is based on their Coffee Lake-U processors with a TDP of 28 W. They were launched in Q3/2018.

Bean Canyon kits
| Model | Processor | TDP | GPU | Max RAM | Display | External USB ports | Networking | Internal 2.5 SATA | Internal M.2 slots | Intel Optane M.2 module |
|---|---|---|---|---|---|---|---|---|---|---|
| NUC8i7BEH | i7-8559U | 28 W | Iris Plus 655 | 32 GB | HDMI 2.0a, DP 1.2 via USB-C (Thunderbolt 3) | USB 10Gbps Type-A (×4), USB 10Gbps Type-C (×1) | Gigabit Ethernet (×1), 802.11ac, Bluetooth 5.0 | Yes (×1) | Yes (×1) | No |
| NUC8i5BEH | i5-8259U | 28 W | Iris Plus 655 | 32 GB | HDMI 2.0a, DP 1.2 via USB-C (Thunderbolt 3) | USB 10Gbps Type-A (×4), USB 10Gbps Type-C (×1) | Gigabit Ethernet (×1), 802.11ac, Bluetooth 5.0 | Yes (×1) | Yes (×1) | No |
| NUC8i5BEK | i5-8259U | 28 W | Iris Plus 655 | 32 GB | HDMI 2.0a, DP 1.2 via USB-C (Thunderbolt 3) | USB 10Gbps Type-A (×4), USB 10Gbps Type-C (×1) | Gigabit Ethernet (×1), 802.11ac, Bluetooth 5.0 | No | Yes (×1) | No |
| NUC8i3BEH | i3-8109U | 28 W | Iris Plus 655 | 32 GB | HDMI 2.0a, DP 1.2 via USB-C (Thunderbolt 3) | USB 10Gbps Type-A (×4), USB 10Gbps Type-C (×1) | Gigabit Ethernet (×1), 802.11ac, Bluetooth 5.0 | Yes (×1) | Yes (×1) | No |
| NUC8i3BEK | i3-8109U | 28 W | Iris Plus 655 | 32 GB | HDMI 2.0a, DP 1.2 via USB-C (Thunderbolt 3) | USB 10Gbps Type-A (×4), USB 10Gbps Type-C (×1) | Gigabit Ethernet (×1), 802.11ac, Bluetooth 5.0 | No | Yes (×1) | No |

=== Cannon Lake-U ===
Intel eighth generation NUC models, codenamed Crimson Canyon, is based on their 10 nm Cannon Lake-U processors. They come with Windows 10 Home x64 preinstalled along with a 1 TB SATA3 HDD. They were launched in Q3/2018. These models come with either 4 or 8 GB of preinstalled, soldered-down, nonupgradable memory.

Crimson Canyon kits
| Model | Processor | TDP | GPU | Max RAM | Display | External USB ports | Networking | Internal 2.5 SATA | Internal M.2 slots | Intel Optane M.2 Module |
|---|---|---|---|---|---|---|---|---|---|---|
| NUC8i3CYSM | i3-8121U | 15 W | AMD Radeon 540, 2GB GDDR5 | 8 GB onboard | HDMI 2.0b (×2) | USB 5Gbps (×4) | Gigabit Ethernet (×1), 802.11ac, Bluetooth 5.0 | Yes (×1) | Yes (×1) | No |
| NUC8i3CYSN | i3-8121U | 15 W | AMD Radeon 540, 2GB GDDR5 | 4 GB onboard | HDMI 2.0b (×2) | USB 5Gbps (×4) | Gigabit Ethernet (×1), 802.11ac, Bluetooth 5.0 | Yes (×1) | Yes (×1) | No |

=== Whiskey Lake-U ===
==== Islay Canyon ====
Intel eighth generation NUC models, codenamed Islay Canyon, is based on their Whiskey Lake-U processors with a TDP of 15 W. They were launched in Q2/2019. These models come with 8 GB of preinstalled, soldered-down, nonupgradable memory.

Islay Canyon kits
| Model | Processor | TDP | GPU | Max RAM | Display | External USB ports | Networking | Internal 2.5 SATA | Internal M.2 slots | Intel Optane M.2 module |
|---|---|---|---|---|---|---|---|---|---|---|
| NUC8i7INH | i7-8565U | 15 W | AMD Radeon 540X | 8 GB onboard | HDMI 2.0b, mDP 1.2 | USB 10Gbps Type-A (×3), USB 10Gbps Type-C (×1) | Gigabit Ethernet (×1), 802.11ac, Bluetooth 5.0 | Yes (×1) | Yes (×1) | No |
| NUC8i5INH | i5-8265U | 15 W | AMD Radeon 540X | 8 GB onboard | HDMI 2.0b, mDP 1.2 | USB 10Gbps Type-A (×3), USB 10Gbps Type-C (×1) | Gigabit Ethernet (×1), 802.11ac, Bluetooth 5.0 | Yes (×1) | Yes (×1) | No |

==== NUC 8 Pro (Provo Canyon) ====
Intel eighth generation NUC models, codenamed Provo Canyon and marketed as NUC 8 Pro, is based on their Whiskey Lake-U processors with a TDP of 15 W and optional vPro. They were launched in Q1/2020. Although the boards all have two M.2 slots, only one is a 22x80 key M storage slot while the other is a 22x30 key E slot for the wireless.

Provo Canyon kits
| Model | Processor | TDP | GPU | Max RAM | Display | External USB ports | Networking | Internal 2.5 SATA | Internal M.2 slots |
|---|---|---|---|---|---|---|---|---|---|
| NUC8i3PNH | i3-8145U | 15 W | Intel UHD Graphics 620 | 64 GB DDR4-2400 | HDMI 2.0a (x2), DP 1.2 via USB-C (Thunderbolt 3), eDP 1.4 | USB 10Gbps Type-A (×3), USB 10Gbps Type-C (×1) | Gigabit Ethernet (×1), 802.11ac, Bluetooth 5.0 | Yes (×1) | Yes (×2) |
| NUC8i3PNK | i3-8145U | 15 W | Intel UHD Graphics 620 | 64 GB DDR4-2400 | HDMI 2.0a (x2), DP 1.2 via USB-C (Thunderbolt 3), eDP 1.4 | USB 10Gbps Type-A (×3), USB 10Gbps Type-C (×1) | Gigabit Ethernet (×1), 802.11ac, Bluetooth 5.0 | No | Yes (x2) |
| NUC8v5PNH | i5-8365U | 15 W | Intel UHD Graphics 620 | 64 GB DDR4-2400 | HDMI 2.0a (x2), DP 1.2 via USB-C (Thunderbolt 3), eDP 1.4 | USB 10Gbps Type-A (×3), USB 10Gbps Type-C (×1) | Gigabit Ethernet (×1), 802.11ac, Bluetooth 5.0 | Yes (×1) | Yes (x2) |
| NUC8v5PNK | i5-8365U | 15 W | Intel UHD Graphics 620 | 64 GB DDR4-2400 | HDMI 2.0a (x2), DP 1.2 via USB-C (Thunderbolt 3), eDP 1.4 | USB 10Gbps Type-A (×3), USB 10Gbps Type-C (×1) | Gigabit Ethernet (×1), 802.11ac, Bluetooth 5.0 | No | Yes (x2) |
| NUC8v7PNH | i7-8665U | 15 W | Intel UHD Graphics 620 | 64 GB DDR4-2400 | HDMI 2.0a (x2), DP 1.2 via USB-C (Thunderbolt 3), eDP 1.4 | USB 10Gbps Type-A (×3), USB 10Gbps Type-C (×1) | Gigabit Ethernet (×1), 802.11ac, Bluetooth 5.0 | Yes (×1) | Yes (x2) |
| NUC8v7PNK | i7-8665U | 15 W | Intel UHD Graphics 620 | 64 GB DDR4-2400 | HDMI 2.0a (x2), DP 1.2 via USB-C (Thunderbolt 3), eDP 1.4 | USB 10Gbps Type-A (×3), USB 10Gbps Type-C (×1) | Gigabit Ethernet (×1), 802.11ac, Bluetooth 5.0 | No | Yes (x2) |

==== NUC 8 Compute Element (Chandler Bay) ====
At Computex 2019, Intel announced the NUC Compute Element, billed as a replacement for the Compute Card. The first compute elements marketed were the NUC 8 Essential and Pro Compute Elements (Chandler Bay, CM8CB.) These were small (65 mm by 95 mm by 6 mm) modules which had Whiskey Lake-U processors, either a Celeron 4305U (CM8CCB4R), Pentium Gold 5405U (CM8PCB4R), or Core i3-8145U (CM8i3CB4N), i5-8265U (CM8i5CB8N), i5-8365U (CM8v5CB8N), i7-8565U (CM8i7CB8N), or i7-8665U (CM8v7CB8N), soldered-down LPDDR3 memory (4 or 8 GB), eMMC storage (on some models), and exposed their power requirements and I/O on a 300-pin edge connector, except for wireless antennas, which were connected separately. They were meant to be combined with a carrier board or device, either the NUC Pro Board Element (CMB1BB, Butler Beach), NUC Pro Assembly Element (CMA1BB, also Butler Beach; this included the board element together with a frame and thermal solution), the NUC Rugged Board Element (CMB1ABA, CMB1ABB, or later CMB1ABC, Austin Beach), or the NUC Rugged Chassis Element (CMCR1ABA, CMCR1ABB, or later CMCR1ABC, also Austin Beach; this included the board element together with a case, thermal solution and power supply.) Also, the NUC Pro Chassis Element (Fort Beach, CMCM2FB / CMCM2FBAV) later became available.

=== Apollo Lake ===
==== NUC 8 Rugged (Chaco Canyon) ====
Intel eighth generation NUC models, codenamed Chaco Canyon and marketed as NUC 8 Rugged, were based on their Apollo Lake processors with a TDP of 15 W, and 64 GB of eMMC. The 4 GB of RAM are soldered directly to the motherboard and are therefore non-upgradeable. This model was fanless and was the first fanless NUC since 2014. The case was larger than many other NUCs at 4.2 x 6.0 x 1.2 inches. They were launched in Q3/2019.

Chaco Canyon kits
| Model | Processor | TDP | GPU | Max RAM | Display | External USB ports | Networking | Internal 2.5 SATA | Internal M.2 slots |
|---|---|---|---|---|---|---|---|---|---|
| NUC8CCHKR | Celeron N3350 | 6 W | Intel HD Graphics 500 | 4 GB LPDDR3 onboard | HDMI 2.0, HDMI 1.4, eDP 1.4 | USB 3.0 Type-A (×2), USB 2.0 (×2) | Gigabit Ethernet (×1), 802.11ac, Bluetooth 4.2 | Yes (×1) | Yes (×2) |

== Ninth generation ==
=== Coffee Lake Refresh-H ===
==== NUC 9 Compute Element (Ghost Canyon / Quartz Canyon) ====
The NUC 9 Compute Element was in Intel's H series. Unlike the previous small U series compute elements, which had a proprietary 300-pin edge connector, these were much larger double-width PCI Express cards meant to fit into a PCI Express backplane. They were codenamed Ghost Canyon, sold as the NUC 9 Extreme Compute Element, and Quartz Canyon, sold as the NUC 9 Pro Compute Element. A carrier board (West Cove) for the elements contained two PCI Express x 16 connectors, one PCI Express x 4 connector, and an M.2 2242/2280/22110 slot. These elements were also sold pre-installed in kit systems, as explained below.

Ghost Canyon / Quartz Canyon Compute Elements
| Model, processor and brand | NUC9i9QNB: Core i9-9980HK, Extreme; NUC9i7QNB: Core i7-9750H, Extreme; NUC9i5QNB: Core i5-9300H, Extreme; NUC9VXQNB: Xeon E-2286M, Pro; NUC9V7QNB: Core i7-9850H, Pro |
| TDP | 45 W |
| GPU | Intel UHD Graphics 630 (P630 on Xeon) |
| RAM | Double-channel DDR4-2666 SO-DIMM, maximum of 64 GB memory, 1.2 V ECC support only with Xeon processor |
| Display ports | Back panel: 1 x HDMI 2.0a, 2 x DisplayPort 1.2 signalling via USB Type-C |
| USB ports | Back panel: 2 x USB 10Gbps (Type-C) / Thunderbolt 3, 4 x USB 10Gbps (Type-A); Internal headers: 1 x USB 10Gbps (Type-C), 2 x USB 2.0 |
| Networking | Wireless 802.11ax and Bluetooth 5; 2 x RJ-45 1 Gbps Ethernet on back panel (1 x Intel i210-AT, 1 x Intel i219-LM) |
| 2.5" SATA | 1 x FPC SATA 6 Gbps data and power connector |
| M.2 slots | 1 x 2242/2280/22110, 1 x 2242/2280, both PCIe 3.0 x 4 or SATA 6 Gb/s |
| Other I/O | 3.5 mm audio jack on back panel Audio front panel header Front panel header CEC Pulse8 Header; PCIe 3.0 x 16 edge connector 2 x RF antenna connectors |

==== NUC 9 Extreme / Pro (Ghost Canyon / Quartz Canyon) ====
The Intel ninth generation NUC models codenamed Ghost Canyon and sold as NUC 9 Extreme, as well as the Intel ninth generation models codenamed Quartz Canyon and sold as NUC 9 Pro, were both based on their Coffee Lake Refresh-H processors with a TDP of 45 W. They were launched in Q1/2020. They supported discrete PCI Express graphic cards (dual-slot and up to 8" in length) and consisted of an upgradable Ghost Canyon or Quartz Canyon compute element together with a West Cove baseboard preassembled into a 5-liter case with a front panel, cabling, fans, and a 500-watt internal power supply.

Ghost Canyon / Quartz Canyon kits
| Model, processor, compute element and brand | NUC9i9QNX: Core i9-9980HK, NUC9i9QNB, Extreme; NUC9i7QNX: Core i7-9750H, NUC9i7QNB, Extreme; NUC9i5QNX: Core i5-9300H, NUC9i5QNB, Extreme; NUC9VXQNX: Xeon E-2286M, NUC9VXQNB, Pro; NUC9V7QNX: Core i7-9850H, NUC9V7QNB, Pro |
| TDP, GPU, RAM, Display ports, Networking | Same as compute element (see above); could be expanded with add-in GPU |
| USB ports | Back panel: 2 x USB 10Gbps (Type-C) / Thunderbolt 3, 4 x USB 10Gbps (Type-A); Front panel: 2 x USB 10Gbps (Type-A); Internal: 1 x USB 10Gbps (Type-A) (front panel), 2 x USB 2.0 headers (compute element) |
| 2.5" SATA | SATA 6 Gbps data and power connectors exist on the compute element but are not usable with the kit. |
| M.2 slots | Compute element: 1 x 2242/2280/22110, 1 x 2242/2280, both PCIe 3.0 x 4 or SATA 6 Gb/s; Baseboard: 1 x 2242/2280/22110, PCIe 3.0 x 4 only |
| Other I/O | Internal PCIe 3.0 x 16 double-width slot, up to 202 mm card length Internal PCIe 3.0 x 4 single-width slot, up to 202 mm card length (use will make x 16 slot single-width); 3.5 mm audio jacks on front and back panels SDXC card reader on front panel |

==== NUC 9 Extreme Laptop Kit (Queens County) ====
Launched in the third quarter of 2019, the NUC 9 Extreme Laptop Kit (Queens County) was a so-called whitebook, resold by Intel's partners. It had a Core i7-9750H processor and 15.6" 1920 x 1080 screen. Various GPU options were available (GeForce GTX 1660Ti, GeForce RTX 2070 Max-Q, GeForce RTX 2060, GeForce RTX 2070 Super Max-Q.)

== Tenth generation ==
=== Comet Lake-U ===
==== NUC 10 Performance (Frost Canyon) ====
Intel tenth generation NUC models, codenamed Frost Canyon and marketed as NUC 10 Performance, is based on their Comet Lake-U processors with a TDP of 25 W. They were launched in November 2019. Variations ending in "N" represent "Lite SKU" models without an audio codec.

Frost Canyon kits
| Model | Board | Processor | TDP | GPU | Max RAM | Display | External USB ports | Networking | Internal 2.5 SATA | Internal M.2 slots | Intel Optane M.2 module |
|---|---|---|---|---|---|---|---|---|---|---|---|
| NUC10i3FNK | NUC10i3FNB | i3-10110U | 25 W | Intel UHD Graphics | 64 GB DDR4-2666 | HDMI 2.0a, DP 1.2 via USB-C (Thunderbolt 3) | USB 10Gbps Type-A (×3), USB 10Gbps Type-C (×2), USB 2.0 (×2) | Gigabit Ethernet (×1), 802.11ax, Bluetooth 5.0 | No | Yes (×1) | No |
| NUC10i3FNKN | NUC10i3FNB | i3-10110U | 25 W | Intel UHD Graphics | 64 GB DDR4-2666 | HDMI 2.0a, DP 1.2 via USB-C (Thunderbolt 3) | USB 10Gbps Type-A (×3), USB 10Gbps Type-C (×2), USB 2.0 (×2) | Gigabit Ethernet (×1), 802.11ax, Bluetooth 5.0 | No | Yes (×1) | No |
| NUC10i3FNH | NUC10i3FNB | i3-10110U | 25 W | Intel UHD Graphics | 64 GB DDR4-2666 | HDMI 2.0a, DP 1.2 via USB-C (Thunderbolt 3) | USB 10Gbps Type-A (×3), USB 10Gbps Type-C (×2), USB 2.0 (×2) | Gigabit Ethernet (×1), 802.11ax, Bluetooth 5.0 | Yes (×1) | Yes (×1) | No |
| NUC10i3FNHN | NUC10i3FNB | i3-10110U | 25 W | Intel UHD Graphics | 64 GB DDR4-2666 | HDMI 2.0a, DP 1.2 via USB-C (Thunderbolt 3) | USB 10Gbps Type-A (×3), USB 10Gbps Type-C (×2), USB 2.0 (×2) | Gigabit Ethernet (×1), 802.11ax, Bluetooth 5.0 | Yes (×1) | Yes (×1) | No |
| NUC10i5FNK | NUC10i5FNB | i5-10210U | 25 W | Intel UHD Graphics | 64 GB DDR4-2666 | HDMI 2.0a, DP 1.2 via USB-C (Thunderbolt 3) | USB 10Gbps Type-A (×3), USB 10Gbps Type-C (×2), USB 2.0 (×2) | Gigabit Ethernet (×1), 802.11ax, Bluetooth 5.0 | No | Yes (×1) | No |
| NUC10i5FNKN | NUC10i5FNB | i5-10210U | 25 W | Intel UHD Graphics | 64 GB DDR4-2666 | HDMI 2.0a, DP 1.2 via USB-C (Thunderbolt 3) | USB 10Gbps Type-A (×3), USB 10Gbps Type-C (×2), USB 2.0 (×2) | Gigabit Ethernet (×1), 802.11ax, Bluetooth 5.0 | No | Yes (×1) | No |
| NUC10i5FNH | NUC10i5FNB | i5-10210U | 25 W | Intel UHD Graphics | 64 GB DDR4-2666 | HDMI 2.0a, DP 1.2 via USB-C (Thunderbolt 3) | USB 10Gbps Type-A (×3), USB 10Gbps Type-C (×2), USB 2.0 (×2) | Gigabit Ethernet (×1), 802.11ax, Bluetooth 5.0 | Yes (×1) | Yes (×1) | No |
| NUC10i5FNHN | NUC10i5FNB | i5-10210U | 25 W | Intel UHD Graphics | 64 GB DDR4-2666 | HDMI 2.0a, DP 1.2 via USB-C (Thunderbolt 3) | USB 10Gbps Type-A (×3), USB 10Gbps Type-C (×2), USB 2.0 (×2) | Gigabit Ethernet (×1), 802.11ax, Bluetooth 5.0 | Yes (×1) | Yes (×1) | No |
| NUC10i7FNK | NUC10i7FNB | i7-10710U | 25 W | Intel UHD Graphics | 64 GB DDR4-2666 | HDMI 2.0a, DP 1.2 via USB-C (Thunderbolt 3) | USB 10Gbps Type-A (×3), USB 10Gbps Type-C (×2), USB 2.0 (×2) | Gigabit Ethernet (×1), 802.11ax, Bluetooth 5.0 | No | Yes (×1) | No |
| NUC10i7FNKN | NUC10i7FNB | i7-10710U | 25 W | Intel UHD Graphics | 64 GB DDR4-2666 | HDMI 2.0a, DP 1.2 via USB-C (Thunderbolt 3) | USB 10Gbps Type-A (×3), USB 10Gbps Type-C (×2), USB 2.0 (×2) | Gigabit Ethernet (×1), 802.11ax, Bluetooth 5.0 | No | Yes (×1) | No |
| NUC10i7FNH | NUC10i7FNB | i7-10710U | 25 W | Intel UHD Graphics | 64 GB DDR4-2666 | HDMI 2.0a, DP 1.2 via USB-C (Thunderbolt 3) | USB 10Gbps Type-A (×3), USB 10Gbps Type-C (×2), USB 2.0 (×2) | Gigabit Ethernet (×1), 802.11ax, Bluetooth 5.0 | Yes (×1) | Yes (×1) | No |
| NUC10i7FNHN | NUC10i7FNB | i7-10710U | 25 W | Intel UHD Graphics | 64 GB DDR4-2666 | HDMI 2.0a, DP 1.2 via USB-C (Thunderbolt 3) | USB 10Gbps Type-A (×3), USB 10Gbps Type-C (×2), USB 2.0 (×2) | Gigabit Ethernet (×1), 802.11ax, Bluetooth 5.0 | Yes (×1) | Yes (×1) | No |

Frost Canyon systems
| Model | Board | Processor | TDP | GPU | Included Memory | Display | External USB ports | Networking | Internal 2.5 SATA | Included Storage | Intel Optane M.2 module |
|---|---|---|---|---|---|---|---|---|---|---|---|
| NUC10i3FNHF | NUC10i3FNB | i3-10110U | 25 W | Intel UHD Graphics | 4 GB DDR4-2666 | HDMI 2.0a, DP 1.2 via USB-C (Thunderbolt 3) | USB 10Gbps Type-A (×3), USB 10Gbps Type-C (×2), USB 2.0 (×2) | Gigabit Ethernet (×1), 802.11ax, Bluetooth 5.0 | 1 TB HDD | Yes (×1) | Yes (16 GB) |
| NUC10i3FNHFA | NUC10i3FNB | i3-10110U | 25 W | Intel UHD Graphics | 4 GB DDR4-2666 | HDMI 2.0a, DP 1.2 via USB-C (Thunderbolt 3) | USB 10Gbps Type-A (×3), USB 10Gbps Type-C (×2), USB 2.0 (×2) | Gigabit Ethernet (×1), 802.11ax, Bluetooth 5.0 | 1 TB HDD | Yes (×1) | Yes (16 GB) |
| NUC10i3FNHJA | NUC10i3FNB | i3-10110U | 25 W | Intel UHD Graphics | 2×4 GB DDR4-2666 | HDMI 2.0a, DP 1.2 via USB-C (Thunderbolt 3) | USB 10Gbps Type-A (×3), USB 10Gbps Type-C (×2), USB 2.0 (×2) | Gigabit Ethernet (×1), 802.11ax, Bluetooth 5.0 | 1 TB HDD | Yes (×1) | Yes (16 GB) |
| NUC10i5FNKP | NUC10i5FNB | i5-10210U | 25 W | Intel UHD Graphics | 2×4 GB DDR4-2666 | HDMI 2.0a, DP 1.2 via USB-C (Thunderbolt 3) | USB 10Gbps Type-A (×3), USB 10Gbps Type-C (×2), USB 2.0 (×2) | Gigabit Ethernet (×1), 802.11ax, Bluetooth 5.0 | No | 256 GB NVMe SSD | No |
| NUC10i5FNKPA | NUC10i5FNB | i5-10210U | 25 W | Intel UHD Graphics | 2×4 GB DDR4-2666 | HDMI 2.0a, DP 1.2 via USB-C (Thunderbolt 3) | USB 10Gbps Type-A (×3), USB 10Gbps Type-C (×2), USB 2.0 (×2) | Gigabit Ethernet (×1), 802.11ax, Bluetooth 5.0 | No | 256 GB NVMe SSD | No |
| NUC10i5FNHCA | NUC10i5FNB | i5-10210U | 25 W | Intel UHD Graphics | 2×4 GB DDR4-2666 | HDMI 2.0a, DP 1.2 via USB-C (Thunderbolt 3) | USB 10Gbps Type-A (×3), USB 10Gbps Type-C (×2), USB 2.0 (×2) | Gigabit Ethernet (×1), 802.11ax, Bluetooth 5.0 | 1 TB HDD | 256 GB NVMe SSD | No |
| NUC10i5FNHF | NUC10i5FNB | i5-10210U | 25 W | Intel UHD Graphics | 4 GB DDR4-2666 | HDMI 2.0a, DP 1.2 via USB-C (Thunderbolt 3) | USB 10Gbps Type-A (×3), USB 10Gbps Type-C (×2), USB 2.0 (×2) | Gigabit Ethernet (×1), 802.11ax, Bluetooth 5.0 | 1 TB HDD | Yes (×1) | Yes (16 GB) |
| NUC10i5FNHJ | NUC10i5FNB | i5-10210U | 25 W | Intel UHD Graphics | 2×4 GB DDR4-2666 | HDMI 2.0a, DP 1.2 via USB-C (Thunderbolt 3) | USB 10Gbps Type-A (×3), USB 10Gbps Type-C (×2), USB 2.0 (×2) | Gigabit Ethernet (×1), 802.11ax, Bluetooth 5.0 | 1 TB HDD | Yes (×1) | Yes (16 GB) |
| NUC10i5FNHJA | NUC10i5FNB | i5-10210U | 25 W | Intel UHD Graphics | 2×4 GB DDR4-2666 | HDMI 2.0a, DP 1.2 via USB-C (Thunderbolt 3) | USB 10Gbps Type-A (×3), USB 10Gbps Type-C (×2), USB 2.0 (×2) | Gigabit Ethernet (×1), 802.11ax, Bluetooth 5.0 | 1 TB HDD | Yes (×1) | Yes (16 GB) |
| NUC10i7FNKP | NUC10i7FNB | i7-10710U | 25 W | Intel UHD Graphics | 2×4 GB DDR4-2666 | HDMI 2.0a, DP 1.2 via USB-C (Thunderbolt 3) | USB 10Gbps Type-A (×3), USB 10Gbps Type-C (×2), USB 2.0 (×2) | Gigabit Ethernet (×1), 802.11ax, Bluetooth 5.0 | No | 256 GB NVMe SSD | No |
| NUC10i7FNKPA | NUC10i7FNB | i7-10710U | 25 W | Intel UHD Graphics | 2×4 GB DDR4-2666 | HDMI 2.0a, DP 1.2 via USB-C (Thunderbolt 3) | USB 10Gbps Type-A (×3), USB 10Gbps Type-C (×2), USB 2.0 (×2) | Gigabit Ethernet (×1), 802.11ax, Bluetooth 5.0 | No | 256 GB NVMe SSD | No |
| NUC10i7FNHC | NUC10i7FNB | i7-10710U | 25 W | Intel UHD Graphics | 2×4 GB DDR4-2666 | HDMI 2.0a, DP 1.2 via USB-C (Thunderbolt 3) | USB 10Gbps Type-A (×3), USB 10Gbps Type-C (×2), USB 2.0 (×2) | Gigabit Ethernet (×1), 802.11ax, Bluetooth 5.0 | 1 TB HDD | 256 GB NVMe SSD | No |
| NUC10i7FNHAA | NUC10i7FNB | i7-10710U | 25 W | Intel UHD Graphics | 2×8 GB DDR4-2666 | HDMI 2.0a, DP 1.2 via USB-C (Thunderbolt 3) | USB 10Gbps Type-A (×3), USB 10Gbps Type-C (×2), USB 2.0 (×2) | Gigabit Ethernet (×1), 802.11ax, Bluetooth 5.0 | 1 TB HDD | 256 GB NVMe SSD | No |
| NUC10i7FNHJA | NUC10i7FNB | i7-10710U | 25 W | Intel UHD Graphics | 2×4 GB DDR4-2666 | HDMI 2.0a, DP 1.2 via USB-C (Thunderbolt 3) | USB 10Gbps Type-A (×3), USB 10Gbps Type-C (×2), USB 2.0 (×2) | Gigabit Ethernet (×1), 802.11ax, Bluetooth 5.0 | 1 TB HDD | Yes (×1) | Yes (16 GB) |

== Eleventh generation ==
=== Tiger Lake-U ===
==== NUC 11 Enthusiast (Phantom Canyon) ====
Intel eleventh generation NUC models, codenamed Phantom Canyon and marketed as NUC 11 Enthusiast, is based on their Tiger Lake-U processors with a TDP from 150 W. It features an Nvidia GeForce RTX 2060 discrete GPU with 6 GB of GDDR6 memory. These models had a case volume of around 1.3 liters (22 x 14 x 4 cm.) They were launched on January 13, 2021.

Phantom Canyon kits
| Model | Board | Processor | TDP | GPU | Max RAM | Display | External USB ports | Networking | Internal M.2 slots | Internal 2.5 SATA |
|---|---|---|---|---|---|---|---|---|---|---|
| NUC11PHKi7C | NUC11PHBi7 | i7-1165G7 | 150 W | Nvidia RTX 2060, Iris Xe (96 EU) | 64 GB DDR4‑3200 via 2×32 GB PC4‑25600 SO‑DIMMs | HDMI 2.0a, 2x DP 1.4 via USB-C (Thunderbolt 4), MiniDP 1.4 | 6×USB 10Gbps (Type-A), 2×USB4 / Thunderbolt 4 (Type-C) | 1×2.5 Gigabit Ethernet, 802.11ax, Bluetooth 5.0 | Yes (×2) | No |

Phantom Canyon systems
| Model | Board | Processor | TDP | GPU | Included Memory | Display | External USB ports | Networking | Included Storage | Internal 2.5 SATA |
|---|---|---|---|---|---|---|---|---|---|---|
| NUC11PHKi7CAA | NUC11PHBi7 | i7-1165G7 | 150 W | Nvidia RTX 2060, Iris Xe (96 EU) | 16 GB DDR4‑3200 via 2×8 GB PC4‑25600 SO‑DIMMs | HDMI 2.0a, 2x DP 1.4 via USB-C (Thunderbolt 4), MiniDP 1.4 | 6×USB 10Gbps (Type-A), 2×USB4 / Thunderbolt 4 (Type-C) | 1×2.5 Gigabit Ethernet, 802.11ax, Bluetooth 5.0 | 512 GB | No |

==== NUC 11 Performance (Panther Canyon) ====
Intel eleventh generation NUC models, codenamed Panther Canyon and marketed as NUC 11 Performance, is based on their Tiger Lake-U processors with a TDP of 40 W. They were launched on January 13, 2021.

Panther Canyon kits
| Model | Board | Processor | TDP | GPU | Max RAM | Display | External USB ports | Networking | Internal M.2 slots | Internal 2.5 SATA |
|---|---|---|---|---|---|---|---|---|---|---|
| NUC11PAKi3 | NUC11PABi3 | i3-1115G4 | 40 W | Intel UHD Graphics | 64 GB DDR4‑3200 via 2×32 GB PC4‑25600 SO‑DIMMs | HDMI 2.0a, 2x DP 1.4 via USB-C (Thunderbolt 3), MiniDP 1.4 | 3×USB 10Gbps (Type-A), 2×USB 10Gbps (Type-C) | 1×2.5 Gigabit Ethernet, 802.11ax, Bluetooth 5.0 | Yes (×1) | No |
| NUC11PAHi3 | NUC11PABi3 | i3-1115G4 | 40 W | Intel UHD Graphics | 64 GB DDR4‑3200 via 2×32 GB PC4‑25600 SO‑DIMMs | HDMI 2.0a, 2x DP 1.4 via USB-C (Thunderbolt 3), MiniDP 1.4 | 3×USB 10Gbps (Type-A), 2×USB 10Gbps (Type-C) | 1×2.5 Gigabit Ethernet, 802.11ax, Bluetooth 5.0 | Yes (×1) | Yes (×1) |
| NUC11PAKi5 | NUC11PABi5 | i5-1135G7 | 40 W | Iris Xe (80 EU) | 64 GB DDR4‑3200 via 2×32 GB PC4‑25600 SO‑DIMMs | HDMI 2.0a, 2x DP 1.4 via USB-C (Thunderbolt 3), MiniDP 1.4 | 3×USB 10Gbps (Type-A), 2×USB 10Gbps (Type-C) | 1×2.5 Gigabit Ethernet, 802.11ax, Bluetooth 5.0 | Yes (×1) | No |
| NUC11PAHi5 | NUC11PABi5 | i5-1135G7 | 40 W | Iris Xe (80 EU) | 64 GB DDR4‑3200 via 2×32 GB PC4‑25600 SO‑DIMMs | HDMI 2.0a, 2x DP 1.4 via USB-C (Thunderbolt 3), MiniDP 1.4 | 3×USB 10Gbps (Type-A), 2×USB 10Gbps (Type-C) | 1×2.5 Gigabit Ethernet, 802.11ax, Bluetooth 5.0 | Yes (×1) | Yes (×1) |
| NUC11PAKi7 | NUC11PABi7 | i7-1165G7 | 40 W | Iris Xe (96 EU) | 64 GB DDR4‑3200 via 2×32 GB PC4‑25600 SO‑DIMMs | HDMI 2.0a, 2x DP 1.4 via USB-C (Thunderbolt 3), MiniDP 1.4 | 3×USB 10Gbps (Type-A), 2×USB 10Gbps (Type-C) | 1×2.5 Gigabit Ethernet, 802.11ax, Bluetooth 5.0 | Yes (×1) | No |
| NUC11PAHi7 | NUC11PABi7 | i7-1165G7 | 40 W | Iris Xe (96 EU) | 64 GB DDR4‑3200 via 2×32 GB PC4‑25600 SO‑DIMMs | HDMI 2.0a, 2x DP 1.4 via USB-C (Thunderbolt 3), MiniDP 1.4 | 3×USB 10Gbps (Type-A), 2×USB 10Gbps (Type-C) | 1×2.5 Gigabit Ethernet, 802.11ax, Bluetooth 5.0 | Yes (×1) | Yes (×1) |

Fully configured NUC 11 Performance Mini PCs featured a wireless charging lid as noted by the letter "Q" in the model name.

Panther Canyon systems
| Model | Board | Processor | TDP | GPU | Included Memory | Display | External USB ports | Networking | Included Storage | Internal 2.5 SATA |
|---|---|---|---|---|---|---|---|---|---|---|
| NUC11PAQi50WA | NUC11PABi5 | i5-1135G7 | 40 W | Iris Xe (80 EU) | 8 GB DDR4‑3200 via 2×4 GB PC4‑25600 SO‑DIMMs | HDMI 2.0a, 2x DP 1.4 via USB-C (Thunderbolt 3), MiniDP 1.4 | 3×USB 10Gbps (Type-A), 2×USB 10Gbps (Type-C) | 1×2.5 Gigabit Ethernet, 802.11ax, Bluetooth 5.0 | 500 GB | Yes (×1) |
| NUC11PAQi70QA | NUC11PABi7 | i7-1165G7 | 40 W | Iris Xe (96 EU) | 16 GB DDR4‑3200 via 2×8 GB PC4‑25600 SO‑DIMMs | HDMI 2.0a, 2x DP 1.4 via USB-C (Thunderbolt 3), MiniDP 1.4 | 3×USB 10Gbps (Type-A), 2×USB 10Gbps (Type-C) | 1×2.5 Gigabit Ethernet, 802.11ax, Bluetooth 5.0 | 500 GB | Yes (×1) |

==== NUC 11 Pro (Tiger Canyon) ====
Intel eleventh generation NUC models, codenamed Tiger Canyon and marketed as NUC 11 Pro, is based on their Tiger Lake-U processors with a TDP of 15 or 28 W. They were launched on first quarter 2021. Variations ending in "L" were only available on Tall Kits and included two more USB 2.0 ports as well as a second 2.5 Gigabit LAN port.

Tiger Canyon kits
| Model | Board | Processor | TDP | GPU | Max RAM | Display | External USB ports | Networking | Internal M.2 slots | Internal 2.5 SATA |
|---|---|---|---|---|---|---|---|---|---|---|
| NUC11TNKi3 | NUC11TNBi3 | i3-1115G4 | 15 W | Intel UHD Graphics | 64 GB DDR4‑3200 via 2×32 GB PC4‑25600 SO‑DIMMs | 2xHDMI 2.0b, 2xDP 1.4a via USB-C (w/Thunderbolt 3, Thunderbolt 4) | 1×USB 2.0 (Type-A), 3×USB 3.2 (Type-A), 2×USB4 (Type-C) | 1×2.5 Gigabit Ethernet, 802.11ax, Bluetooth 5.2 | Yes (×1) | No |
| NUC11TNHi3 | NUC11TNBi3 | i3-1115G4 | 15 W | Intel UHD Graphics | 64 GB DDR4‑3200 via 2×32 GB PC4‑25600 SO‑DIMMs | 2xHDMI 2.0b, 2xDP 1.4a via USB-C (w/Thunderbolt 3, Thunderbolt 4) | 1×USB 2.0 (Type-A), 3×USB 3.2 (Type-A), 2×USB4 (Type-C) | 1×2.5 Gigabit Ethernet, 802.11ax, Bluetooth 5.2 | Yes (×1) | Yes (×1) |
| NUC11TNHi30L | NUC11TNBi3 | i3-1115G4 | 15 W | Intel UHD Graphics | 64 GB DDR4‑3200 via 2×32 GB PC4‑25600 SO‑DIMMs | 2xHDMI 2.0b, 2xDP 1.4a via USB-C (w/Thunderbolt 3, Thunderbolt 4) | 3×USB 2.0 (Type-A), 3×USB 3.2 (Type-A), 2×USB4 (Type-C) | 2×2.5 Gigabit Ethernet, 802.11ax, Bluetooth 5.2 | Yes (×1) | Yes (×1) |
| NUC11TNKi5 | NUC11TNBi5 | i5-1135G7 | 28 W | Iris Xe (80 EU) | 64 GB DDR4‑3200 via 2×32 GB PC4‑25600 SO‑DIMMs | 2xHDMI 2.0b, 2xDP 1.4a via USB-C (w/Thunderbolt 3, Thunderbolt 4) | 1×USB 2.0 (Type-A), 3×USB 3.2 (Type-A), 2×USB4 (Type-C) | 1×2.5 Gigabit Ethernet, 802.11ax, Bluetooth 5.2 | Yes (×1) | No |
| NUC11TNHi5 | NUC11TNBi5 | i5-1135G7 | 28 W | Iris Xe (80 EU) | 64 GB DDR4‑3200 via 2×32 GB PC4‑25600 SO‑DIMMs | 2xHDMI 2.0b, 2xDP 1.4a via USB-C (w/Thunderbolt 3, Thunderbolt 4) | 1×USB 2.0 (Type-A), 3×USB 3.2 (Type-A), 2×USB4 (Type-C) | 1×2.5 Gigabit Ethernet, 802.11ax, Bluetooth 5.2 | Yes (×1) | Yes (×1) |
| NUC11TNHi50L | NUC11TNBi5 | i5-1135G7 | 28 W | Iris Xe (80 EU) | 64 GB DDR4‑3200 via 2×32 GB PC4‑25600 SO‑DIMMs | 2xHDMI 2.0b, 2xDP 1.4a via USB-C (w/Thunderbolt 3, Thunderbolt 4) | 3×USB 2.0 (Type-A), 3×USB 3.2 (Type-A), 2×USB4 (Type-C) | 2×2.5 Gigabit Ethernet, 802.11ax, Bluetooth 5.2 | Yes (×1) | Yes (×1) |
| NUC11TNKv5 | NUC11TNBv5 | i5-1145G7 | 28 W | Iris Xe (80 EU) | 64 GB DDR4‑3200 via 2×32 GB PC4‑25600 SO‑DIMMs | 2xHDMI 2.0b, 2xDP 1.4a via USB-C (w/Thunderbolt 3, Thunderbolt 4) | 1×USB 2.0 (Type-A), 3×USB 3.2 (Type-A), 2×USB4 (Type-C) | 1×2.5 Gigabit Ethernet, 802.11ax, Bluetooth 5.2 | Yes (×1) | No |
| NUC11TNHv5 | NUC11TNBv5 | i5-1145G7 | 28 W | Iris Xe (80 EU) | 64 GB DDR4‑3200 via 2×32 GB PC4‑25600 SO‑DIMMs | 2xHDMI 2.0b, 2xDP 1.4a via USB-C (w/Thunderbolt 3, Thunderbolt 4) | 1×USB 2.0 (Type-A), 3×USB 3.2 (Type-A), 2×USB4 (Type-C) | 1×2.5 Gigabit Ethernet, 802.11ax, Bluetooth 5.2 | Yes (×1) | Yes (×1) |
| NUC11TNHv50L | NUC11TNBv5 | i5-1145G7 | 28 W | Iris Xe (80 EU) | 64 GB DDR4‑3200 via 2×32 GB PC4‑25600 SO‑DIMMs | 2xHDMI 2.0b, 2xDP 1.4a via USB-C (w/Thunderbolt 3, Thunderbolt 4) | 3×USB 2.0 (Type-A), 3×USB 3.2 (Type-A), 2×USB4 (Type-C) | 2×2.5 Gigabit Ethernet, 802.11ax, Bluetooth 5.2 | Yes (×1) | Yes (×1) |
| NUC11TNKi7 | NUC11TNBi7 | i7-1165G7 | 28 W | Iris Xe (96 EU) | 64 GB DDR4‑3200 via 2×32 GB PC4‑25600 SO‑DIMMs | 2xHDMI 2.0b, 2xDP 1.4a via USB-C (w/Thunderbolt 3, Thunderbolt 4) | 1×USB 2.0 (Type-A), 3×USB 3.2 (Type-A), 2×USB4 (Type-C) | 1×2.5 Gigabit Ethernet, 802.11ax, Bluetooth 5.2 | Yes (×1) | No |
| NUC11TNHi7 | NUC11TNBi7 | i7-1165G7 | 28 W | Iris Xe (96 EU) | 64 GB DDR4‑3200 via 2×32 GB PC4‑25600 SO‑DIMMs | 2xHDMI 2.0b, 2xDP 1.4a via USB-C (w/Thunderbolt 3, Thunderbolt 4) | 1×USB 2.0 (Type-A), 3×USB 3.2 (Type-A), 2×USB4 (Type-C) | 1×2.5 Gigabit Ethernet, 802.11ax, Bluetooth 5.2 | Yes (×1) | Yes (×1) |
| NUC11TNHi70L | NUC11TNBi7 | i7-1165G7 | 28 W | Iris Xe (96 EU) | 64 GB DDR4‑3200 via 2×32 GB PC4‑25600 SO‑DIMMs | 2xHDMI 2.0b, 2xDP 1.4a via USB-C (w/Thunderbolt 3, Thunderbolt 4) | 3×USB 2.0 (Type-A), 3×USB 3.2 (Type-A), 2×USB4 (Type-C) | 2×2.5 Gigabit Ethernet, 802.11ax, Bluetooth 5.2 | Yes (×1) | Yes (×1) |
| NUC11TNKv7 | NUC11TNBv7 | i7-1185G7 | 28 W | Iris Xe (96 EU) | 64 GB DDR4‑3200 via 2×32 GB PC4‑25600 SO‑DIMMs | 2xHDMI 2.0b, 2xDP 1.4a via USB-C (w/Thunderbolt 3, Thunderbolt 4) | 1×USB 2.0 (Type-A), 3×USB 3.2 (Type-A), 2×USB4 (Type-C) | 1×2.5 Gigabit Ethernet, 802.11ax, Bluetooth 5.2 | Yes (×1) | No |
| NUC11TNHv7 | NUC11TNBv7 | i7-1185G7 | 28 W | Iris Xe (96 EU) | 64 GB DDR4‑3200 via 2×32 GB PC4‑25600 SO‑DIMMs | 2xHDMI 2.0b, 2xDP 1.4a via USB-C (w/Thunderbolt 3, Thunderbolt 4) | 1×USB 2.0 (Type-A), 3×USB 3.2 (Type-A), 2×USB4 (Type-C) | 1×2.5 Gigabit Ethernet, 802.11ax, Bluetooth 5.2 | Yes (×1) | Yes (×1) |
| NUC11TNHv70L | NUC11TNBv7 | i7-1185G7 | 28 W | Iris Xe (96 EU) | 64 GB DDR4‑3200 via 2×32 GB PC4‑25600 SO‑DIMMs | 2xHDMI 2.0b, 2xDP 1.4a via USB-C (w/Thunderbolt 3, Thunderbolt 4) | 3×USB 2.0 (Type-A), 3×USB 3.2 (Type-A), 2×USB4 (Type-C) | 2×2.5 Gigabit Ethernet, 802.11ax, Bluetooth 5.2 | Yes (×1) | Yes (×1) |

==== NUC 11 Compute Element (Elk Bay) ====
Like the earlier NUC 8 Compute Element, the NUC 11 Compute Element (Elk Bay, CM11EB) was also a U-series compute element, measuring 95 x 65 x 6 mm and using a 300-pin edge connector for I/O (except for antenna connections) and power. It had soldered-down LPDDR4X memory, either 4, 8 or 16 GB, depending on the model, and came with either a Celeron 6305 (CM11EBC4W) or a Core i3-1115G4 (CM11EBi38W), i5-1135G7 (CM11EBi58W), i5-1145G7 (CM11EBv58W), i7-1165G7 (CM11EBi716W), or i7-1185G7 (CM11EBv716W) processor. As well as earlier board, assembly or chassis elements, Elk Bay was also compatible with the new Garden Beach (CMB2GB or CMA2GB) board or assembly elements, which unfortunately were not compatible with the older Chandler Bay NUC 8 Compute Elements. It could also be used in the NUC P14E Laptop Element (Camden County, CMCN1CC). This carrier element, announced around Sep. 2021, turned the compute element into a complete laptop; it came with a 3000 x 2000 13.9" touchscreen-equipped display. Unfortunately, it was not compatible with the NUC 8 Compute Element (Chandler Bay).

==== NUC M15 Laptop Kit (Bishop County) ====
The first version of the NUC M15 Laptop Kit (Bishop County), announced November 2020, was a whitebook that was meant to be rebranded and resold by Intel's partners. It was a 15.6" laptop that was available with either a Core i7-1165G7 or Core i5-1135G7 CPU, an FHD (1920 x 1080) display, either touch or non-touch, and either 8 GB or 16 GB of soldered-down LPDDR4x memory. One M.2 2280 slot (PCI Express 4.0 x 4) was available for internal storage. Ports included two USB Type-C Thunderbolt 4 / USB4 with DisplayPort Alternate Mode, two USB 10Gbps Type-A, one HDMI 2.0b, and one 3.5 mm audio jack. Some models came with a preinstalled 512 GB NVMe SSD and operating system (Windows 10 or 11) and had Intel Evo branding.

=== Tiger Lake-H ===
==== NUC X15 Laptop Kit (King County) ====
The first version of the NUC X15 Laptop Kit (King County), launched around September 2021, had Tiger Lake-H processors (either Core i5-11400H or Core i7-11800H), either an Nvidia GeForce RTX 3060 GPU with 6 GB of GDDR6 video memory or a RTX 3070 with 8 GB of memory, and a 15.6" screen (either 1920 x 1080 or 2560 x 1440.) System memory was double-channel DDR4-3200 SO-DIMM and was not included. Like the M15 laptop kit, this was meant to be resold by Intel's partners. The maximum total system memory supported is 32 GB. 64 GB is not supported and, according to Intel, may cause instability.

=== Tiger Lake-B ===
==== NUC 11 Extreme Compute Element (Driver Bay) ====
The NUC 11 Extreme Compute Element (Driver Bay) was an H-series compute element which, like the earlier NUC 9 elements, was a double-width PCI Express card designed to fit into a PCIe backplane. It had either a Core i7-11700B (NUC11DBBi7) or i9-11900KB (NUC11DBBi9) processor and used dual-channel DDR4-3200 SODIMM memory, up to a maximum of 64 GB. It could be used with the BBMC1B1 (Monster Cove Gen4) baseboard, which was similar to the previous West Cove baseboard but supported PCIe 4.0.

==== NUC 11 Extreme (Beast Canyon) ====
Intel announced the NUC 11 Extreme Kit, codenamed Beast Canyon, in Q3 2021. Similar to the earlier NUC 9 Extreme, it was targeted towards gamers with its compact modular chassis, desktop CPU, and replaceable RGB-lit skull logo. It consisted of a Driver Bay compute element together with a Monster Cove Gen4 baseboard, preassembled into an approximately 8-liter case together with fans, cables, front panel and a 650-watt power supply. It supported a dual-slot add-in PCI express card up to 300 mm (around 12") in length.

=== Jasper Lake ===
==== NUC 11 Essential (Atlas Canyon) ====
The UCFF system kit (NUC11ATKPE and NUC11ATKC4) models, codenamed Atlas Canyon, based on Pentium Silver & Celeron-branded Jasper Lake SoC 10 nm processor family. They were launched in Q1/2022.

RAM: DDR4-2933 1.2V SO-DIMM.

Atlas Canyon kits
| Model | Processor | TDP | GPU | Max RAM | Display | External USB ports | Networking | Internal M.2 slots | Internal 2.5 SATA |
|---|---|---|---|---|---|---|---|---|---|
| NUC11ATKPE | Pentium Silver N6005 | 15 W | UHD Graphics (32 EU) | 32 GB | 1× DisplayPort 1.4, 1× HDMI 2.0 | All Type-A; 2× USB 2.0; 2× USB 5Gbps; 2× USB 10Gbps | 1× Gigabit Ethernet, 802.11ac, Bluetooth 5.0 | Yes (×1) | No |
| NUC11ATKC4 | Celeron N5105 | 15 W | UHD Graphics (24 EU) | 32 GB | 1× DisplayPort 1.4, 1× HDMI 2.0 | All Type-A; 2× USB 2.0; 2× USB 5Gbps; 2× USB 10Gbps | 1× Gigabit Ethernet, 802.11ac, Bluetooth 5.0 | Yes (×1) | No |
| NUC11ATKC2 | Celeron N4505 | 10 W | UHD Graphics (16 EU) | 32 GB | 1× DisplayPort 1.4, 1× HDMI 2.0 | All Type-A; 2× USB 2.0; 2× USB 5Gbps; 2× USB 10Gbps | 1× Gigabit Ethernet, 802.11ac, Bluetooth 5.0 | Yes (×1) | No |

== Twelfth generation ==
=== Alder Lake ===
==== NUC 12 Compute Element (H-Series) (Eden Bay) ====
Like the earlier NUC 9 and NUC 11 Extreme compute elements, the H-series NUC 12 Compute Element, launched in February 2022 and codenamed Eden Bay, was a double-width PCI Express card meant to fit into a PCI Express backplane. It was branded as either an Extreme or Pro X compute element, depending on the model. A carrier board (BBMC1B2, Monster Cove Gen5) for the elements had two generation 5 PCIe x 16 slots, but no x4 PCIe slot or M.2 slot.

Eden Bay Compute Elements
| Model, processor and brand | NUC12EDBi9: Core i9-12900, Extreme; NUC12EDBi7: Core i7-12700, Extreme; NUC12EDBv9: Core i9-12900, Pro X NUC12EDBv7: Core i7-12700, Pro X |
| TDP | 65 W |
| GPU | Intel UHD Graphics 770 |
| RAM | Double-channel DDR4-3200 SO-DIMM, maximum of 64 GB memory ECC support only on Pro X models |
| Display ports | Back panel: 1 x HDMI 2.1, 2 x DisplayPort 1.4 signalling via USB Type-C ports |
| USB ports | Back panel: 2 x USB 40Gbps / Thunderbolt 4, 6 x USB 10Gbps Type-A; Internal headers: 2 x USB 3.2 Gen 2x2 (Type-C), 2 x USB 2.0 |
| Networking | Wireless 802.11ax and Bluetooth 5.2; 1 x RJ-45 10 Gbps Ethernet on back panel 1 x RJ-45 2.5 Gbps Ethernet on back panel (except NUC12EDBi7) |
| 2.5" SATA | No support |
| M.2 slots | 2 x 2242/2280, PCIe 4.0 x 4 or SATA 6 Gb/s; 1 x 2280, PCIe 4.0 x 4 |
| Other I/O | Front panel / fan header (includes USB 2.0); PCIe 5.0 x 16 edge connector 2 x RF antenna connectors |

==== NUC 12 Extreme / Pro X (Dragon Canyon) ====
The NUC 12 Extreme or Pro X (Dragon Canyon) consisted of an Eden Bay NUC 12 Extreme or Pro X Compute Element, preassembled into an approximately 8-liter case together with fans, 650-watt power supply, front panel, cabling and a Monster Cove Gen5 baseboard. These models could accept a dual-slot PCI Express add-in card up to 300 mm (around 12") in length.

=== Alder Lake-H ===
==== NUC X15 Laptop Kit (Alder County) ====
A second version of the NUC X15 Laptop Kit (Alder County) launched in the third quarter of 2022. It had a Core i7-12700H processor, a 15.6" 1920 x 1080 screen, and either Intel Arc A550M or A730M graphics.

==== NUC 12 Enthusiast (Serpent Canyon) ====
The NUC 12 Enthusiast, codenamed Serpent Canyon, was released in late Q3 2022 and features the Alder Lake-H Core i7-12700H processor with Intel Arc A770M Graphics and 16 GB GDDR6 VRAM. It has a case volume of approximately 2.5 liters (23 x 18 x 6 cm).

=== Alder Lake-P ===
==== NUC M15 Laptop Kit (Rooks County) ====
A second version of the NUC M15 Laptop Kit (Rooks County) launched in the second quarter of 2022. It had either a Core i5-1240P or Core i7-1260P processor, a 15.6" 1920 x 1080 screen, either touch or non-touch, and 16 GB of soldered-down LPDDR5 memory.

==== NUC 12 Pro (Wall Street Canyon) ====
Intel's twelfth generation NUC models, codenamed Wall Street Canyon and marketed as NUC 12 Pro, were based on their Alder Lake-P processors with a TDP of up to 28 W. NUC 12 Pro was launched in Q3 2022 by Intel and subsequently moved to Asus, who scheduled it to be discontinued by the end of 2024.

=== Alder Lake-U ===
==== NUC 12 Compute Element (U-Series) (Hard Bay) ====
The U-series NUC 12 Compute Element (ELM12HB, Hard Bay) had the same form factor (95 x 65 x 6 mm) and 300-pin connector as the earlier NUC 8 and NUC 11 U-series compute elements. It had an Alder Lake-U processor, either a Celeron 7305 or Core i3-1215U, i5-1235U, i5-1245U, i7-1255U, or i7-1265U, and soldered-down LPDDR5 memory (4 GB to 32 GB, depending on the model.) It was compatible with existing assembly, board, and chassis carrier elements, except for the Multi-HDMI version of the NUC Rugged Board Element or NUC Rugged Chassis Element (Austin Beach.)

== Thirteenth generation ==
=== Raptor Lake ===
==== NUC 13 Extreme Compute Element (Shrike Bay) ====
The NUC 13 Extreme Compute Element (Shrike Bay) was an H-series, PCI Express-based element but was larger than previous H-series elements, around 300 mm long and wider (46 mm) than a double-width PCIe slot. It did not fit into a standard PCIe backplane since as well as the standard x16 edge connector it had an auxiliary extension edge connector. This element was launched November 2022 and fit into the BBRN1B1 (Raptor Canyon) baseboard, which had one PCIe 5.0 x 16 slot together with the auxiliary extension on top of the board for the compute element, and one PCIe 5.0 x 16 slot on the other side of the board available for an add-in card. Neither were compatible with previous H-series compute elements and baseboards. The compute element had either a Core i5-13600K, i7-13700K or i9-13900K processor. Models with -KF processors without graphics were also available.

==== NUC 13 Extreme (Raptor Canyon) ====
The 13th generation of NUC Extreme models, codenamed Raptor Canyon, launched in November 2022. The NUC 13 Extreme Kit had a much larger case (approximately 14 liters) than previous NUC Extreme models and consisted of a NUC 13 Extreme Compute Element together with a Raptor Canyon baseboard assembled into a case together with fans, cabling, a 750-watt power supply, and a front panel. Unlike previous NUC Extreme models, the add-in card and compute element were mounted in different compartments; the compute element and power supply were mounted in a compartment above the baseboard and the add-in card in a compartment below the baseboard. This allowed using larger add-in cards, up to triple-width and up to 313 mm in length. Maximum supported add-in card power was 450 watts. This is the last NUC Extreme model to be produced to date.

=== Raptor Lake-P ===
==== NUC 13 Pro (Arena Canyon / Liberty Canyon) / Pro Desk Edition (Vivid Canyon) ====
The 13th generation of NUC models, codenamed Arena Canyon or Liberty Canyon and marketed as NUC 13 Pro, are based on Intel's Raptor Lake-P processors (a few models use -U) with a TDP of 15 W for Core i3 models and 28W for Core i5 and i7 models. Launched in Q1 2023, Arena Canyon was the last NUC Pro model to be made by Intel with future NUC 13 Pro models being produced by Asus. The Arena Canyon board was also placed in an aluminum case with a white lid and sold as the NUC 13 Pro Desk Edition (Vivid Canyon), released to select regions in Q2 2023.

Arena Canyon kits
| Model | Processor | TDP | GPU | Max RAM | Display | External USB ports | Networking | Internal M.2 slots | Internal 2.5 SATA |
|---|---|---|---|---|---|---|---|---|---|
| NUC13ANHi7 | i7-1360P | 28 W | Iris Xe (96 EU) | 64 GB | 2× Thunderbolt 4; 2× HDMI 2.1 | 1× USB 2.0 (Type-A); 3× USB 10Gbps (Type-A); 2× USB 40Gbps | 1× 2.5 GbE, 802.11ax, Bluetooth 5.3 | Yes (×1) | Yes (×1) |
| NUC13ANKi7 | i7-1360P | 28 W | Iris Xe (96 EU) | 64 GB | 2× Thunderbolt 4; 2× HDMI 2.1 | 1× USB 2.0 (Type-A); 3× USB 10Gbps (Type-A); 2× USB 40Gbps | 1× 2.5 GbE, 802.11ax, Bluetooth 5.3 | Yes (×1) | No |
| NUC13ANHi5 | i5-1340P | 28 W | Iris Xe (80 EU) | 64 GB | 2× Thunderbolt 4; 2× HDMI 2.1 | 1× USB 2.0 (Type-A); 3× USB 10Gbps (Type-A); 2× USB 40Gbps | 1× 2.5 GbE, 802.11ax, Bluetooth 5.3 | Yes (×1) | Yes (×1) |
| NUC13ANKi5 | i5-1340P | 28 W | Iris Xe (80 EU) | 64 GB | 2× Thunderbolt 4; 2× HDMI 2.1 | 1× USB 2.0 (Type-A); 3× USB 10Gbps (Type-A); 2× USB 40Gbps | 1× 2.5 GbE, 802.11ax, Bluetooth 5.3 | Yes (×1) | No |
| NUC13ANHi3 | i3-1315U | 15 W | Intel UHD Graphics | 64 GB | 2× Thunderbolt 4; 2× HDMI 2.1 | 1× USB 2.0 (Type-A); 3× USB 10Gbps (Type-A); 2× USB 40Gbps | 1× 2.5 GbE, 802.11ax, Bluetooth 5.3 | Yes (×1) | Yes (×1) |
| NUC13ANKi3 | i3-1315U | 15 W | Intel UHD Graphics | 64 GB | 2× Thunderbolt 4; 2× HDMI 2.1 | 1× USB 2.0 (Type-A); 3× USB 10Gbps (Type-A); 2× USB 40Gbps | 1× 2.5 GbE, 802.11ax, Bluetooth 5.3 | Yes (×1) | No |

=== Raptor Lake-H ===
==== NUC 13 Pro (refresh) ====
Asus introduced a new version of the NUC 13 Pro with Raptor Lake-H processors (Core i5-13420H or i7-13620H.)

=== Raptor Lake-U ===
==== NUC 13 Compute Element (U-Series) (Icon Bay) ====
The NUC 13 Compute Element (Icon Bay) was a U-series compute element, measuring, like previous U-series elements, 95 mm x 65 mm x 6 mm. It was launched in May 2023 and came with either a Core i7-1365U, i7-1365UE, i7-1355U, i5-1345U, i5-1335U, i5-1335UE, i5-1315U or i3-1315UE processor, or a Processor U300 or U300E. Each element had between 8 GB and 32GB soldered-down LPDDR5 memory, depending on the model. Like the NUC 12 Compute Element, this element was not compatible with the multi-HDMI version of Austin Beach.

=== Alder Lake-N ===
==== NUC 13 Rugged (Bravo Canyon) ====
The NUC 13 Rugged line was first announced in May 2023 by Intel but later released by Asus in early 2024. The fanless, ruggedized NUCs are based on Alder Lake-N processors and are the successor to the NUC 8 Rugged released in 2019.

== Fourteenth generation ==
Subsequent generations after Raptor Lake are exclusively designed, produced, and manufactured by Asus.

=== Meteor Lake ===
==== NUC 14 Pro and Pro+ (Revel Canyon) ====
The 14th generation of NUC models, codenamed Revel Canyon and announced by Asus in March 2024, are based on Intel's Series 1 Core Ultra processors.

==== ROG NUC / NUC 14 Performance (Scorpion Canyon) ====
The first ROG NUC was announced July 6, 2024. Both it and the NUC 14 Performance have codename Scorpion Canyon, a 3-liter case, Core Ultra Series 1 processors, and discrete Nvidia RTX 40 series graphics.

=== Lunar Lake ===
==== NUC 14 Pro AI / Pro AI+ (Lunar Canyon) ====
The NUC 14 Pro AI was announced December 2024, and has a Core Ultra Series 2 processor (226V, 228V, 256V, 258V, or 288V.)

=== Alder Lake-N / Twin Lake-N ===
==== NUC 14 Essential (Mill Canyon) ====
The NUC 14 Essential (Mill Canyon), announced January 2025, uses an Alder Lake-N or Twin Lake-N processor, either Core 3 N355 or Processor N97, N150, or N250. Maximum RAM is 16 GB and there is one internal M.2 slot available for storage.

== Fifteenth generation ==
=== Arrow Lake ===
==== NUC 15 Pro and Pro+ (Cyber Canyon) ====
The NUC 15 Pro, codenamed Cyber Canyon, was announced February 11, 2025 and uses either Core 3, Core 5, Core 7, or Core Ultra Series 2 (Arrow Lake) processors. Unlike earlier models, the tall kit does not support mounting a 2.5" drive. It is possible to install an extra 2280 M.2 module in the tall kit.

==== ROG NUC (2025) / NUC 15 Performance (Jean Canyon) ====
Asus announced an upgraded version of the ROG NUC on June 19, 2025. Both it and the NUC 15 Performance have a 3-liter case size, use Core Ultra Series 2 HX processors, and include a discrete Nvidia RTX 50 series mobile GPU.

==== ROG NUC 16 ====
Asus announced another version of the ROG NUC on May 15, 2026. It uses up to a Core Ultra 9 290HX Plus processor and up to a Nvidia RTX 5080 mobile GPU, and supports up to 128GB of DDR5-6400 memory. It has the same 3-liter form factor as the previous ROG NUCs.

== Sixteenth generation ==
=== Panther Lake ===
==== NUC 16 Pro (Grand Canyon) ====
At CES 2026, Asus announced the NUC 16 Pro, with Panther Lake processors. These systems either have built-in LPDDR5x-8533 memory (up to 96 GB) or accept two DDR5 CSODIMM modules, up to 128 GB total, depending on the model.

== Reception and ecosystem ==
The NUC was seen by some reviewers as Intel's response to (or adoption of) the Apple Mac Mini format, although NUC is actually smaller, physically. Given its kit nature, other reviewers have seen it as a more powerful Raspberry Pi, particularly since the NUC boards could be bought without a case. The NUC can also be seen as an extension or continuation of Intel's earlier mobile-on-desktop (MoDT) initiative that was spearheaded by AOpen as early as 2004.

Most of the third-generation NUCs come in two case sizes, one with room for a 2.5-inch drive, and one without. The smaller case, although lacking room for a 2.5" drive, still has an internal SATA connector (including SATA power). Some larger third-party cases have appeared that can fit such drives.

The Intel case is actively cooled with a fan. Silent PC Review notes that “The original Intel NUC had "the distinction of being the quietest fan-cooled mini-computer we've come across." The NUC D54250WYK [Haswell-based], with the same cooling system, sounds exactly the same. In normal use, you can't hear the fan until your ear is inches from the unit.” Nevertheless, passively cooled third-party cases have appeared on the market as well. Larger or metallic third-party cases also provide lower operating temperatures.

A review by the Tech Report of the pre-production 2012-vintage NUC found that the NUC would seize up after a few gigabytes were transferred over wireless and that the problem could be alleviated by better cooling of the NUC case. Intel later increased the default fan speed for production machines through a BIOS update (downloadable from Intel's web site for "early adopters").

Regarding power consumption, in their review of the D54250WYK with a Haswell i5-4250, Silent PC Review concluded that "An idle power level of just 6 W and typical use power barely into two digits is very impressive in one sense; in another sense, it's what you find in current Ultrabooks using similar components."

Other companies have subsequently adopted a form factor similar, but not identical, to Intel's NUC. For example, Gigabyte Technology launched their BRIX series, which attempts to differentiate itself using more powerful components, up to the i7-4770R processor, which embeds Intel Iris Pro Graphics.

=== Operating system support ===
NUCs support UEFI compatible operating systems, such as Microsoft Windows, as well as most distributions of Linux. Additionally, they can be used for virtualization with a variety of different hypervisor hosts; multiple NUCs can be used together to create a home lab for learning purposes.

It is technically possible, with some limitations in functionality, to install an unauthorized copy of MacOS on a NUC, creating a "Hackintosh". The pre-Haswell Core i3 and Core i5 NUCs will run OS X 10.9 Mavericks well.

Skylake and Broadwell-based NUC is also a supported device in Google Fuchsia OS.
