= Exim Bank =

Exim Bank or Export-Import Bank may refer to:

- Exim Bank (Bangladesh), a private commercial bank in Bangladesh
- Export–Import Bank of China, a policy bank in the People's Republic of China
- Export–Import Bank of the Republic of China, a bank in the Republic of China (Taiwan)
- Exim Bank (Comoros), a commercial bank in the Comoros
- Exim Bank (Djibouti), a commercial bank in Djibouti
- Exim Bank Group (East Africa), a financial services conglomerate based in the African Great Lakes region
- Eximbank of Hungary, the official export credit agency of Hungary
- Exim Bank of India, a finance institution in India, established in 1982 under Export-Import Bank of India Act 1981
- Export–Import Bank of Korea, a bank in South Korea
- Export–Import Bank of Malaysia, a commercial bank in Malaysia
- Eximbank (Moldova), a bank owned by Intesa Sanpaolo in Moldova
- EXIM Bank of Pakistan, a development finance institution owned by the Government of Pakistan
- Exim Banca Românească, a bank in Romania based in Bucharest
- Exim Bank (Tanzania), a commercial bank in Tanzania
- Export–Import Bank of Thailand, a state-owned bank headquartered in Bangkok, Thailand
- Eximbank (Transnstria) (ОАО «Эксимбанк»), a state-owned bank in the unrecognised state of Transnistria
- Exim Bank (Uganda), a commercial bank in Uganda
- Eximbank (Vietnam), a commercial bank in Vietnam
- Export–Import Bank of the United States, the official export credit agency (ECA) of the United States federal government

== See also ==
- African Export–Import Bank, a Pan-African multilateral financial institution, headquartered in Cairo, Egypt
- Exim Bank Agricultural University Bangladesh, the first private agricultural university in Bangladesh
- Japan Bank for International Cooperation, formerly Japan Export-Import Bank
- State Export-Import Bank of Ukraine
- Exim Bank Team China, a title in auto racing for teams sponsored by Exim Bank of China
