= Exim Bank of India =

Financial institution in India

INDIA EXIM BANK
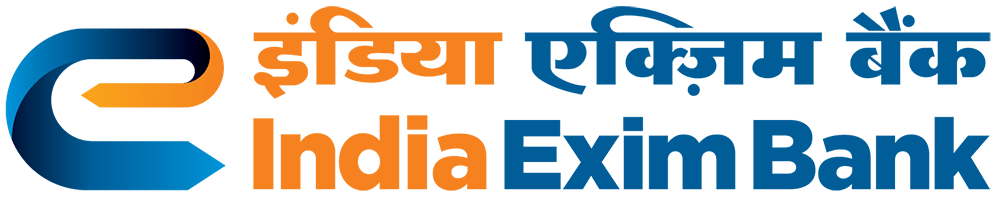
- Type: Public
- Industry: Banking
- Founded: 1 January 1982 (introduced); 7 April 1982 (received assent of President of India for the Export-Import Bank of India Act, 1981)
- Founder: Government of India
- Headquarters: Mumbai
- Area served: 9 branches in India (November 2022)
- Key people: Ms. Harsha Bangari Chairman-cum-Managing Director
- Services: Banking; Financial Services
- Number of employees: 540 (2021)
- Subsidiaries: EXIM FINSERVE IFSC; INDIA EXIM BANK, Asset Management Arm; INDIA EXIM BANK, London Branch (2006)
- Website: www.eximbankindia.in

The Export-Import Bank of India (INDIA EXIM BANK) is a specialised financial institution in India that was established in 1982. The bank's primary function is to finance, facilitate and promote India's international trade. It is owned by the Government of India and operates as a statutory corporation. Its operations are governed by the Export-Import Bank of India Act, 1981.

INDIA EXIM BANK provides a wide range of financial services to Indian exporters and importers. These services include export credit, pre-shipment credit, post-shipment credit, and overseas investment finance. The bank also provides a range of advisory and support services to Indian businesses looking to expand their international operations. In addition to its domestic operations, INDIA EXIM BANK has a strong presence in the international market. It has established partnerships and collaborations with other international development banks and financial institutions to support trade and investment flows between India and other countries.

== History ==
The Export-Import Bank of India (INDIA EXIM BANK) was founded by the Government of India under the Export-Import Bank of India Act, 1981, which was introduced in the Indian Parliament by the then Finance Minister, Shri Pranab Mukherjee. The act was passed by both houses of parliament and received the assent of the President of India on 07-April-1982. The first Chairman and Managing Director of INDIA EXIM BANK was Mr. R.S. Rathore.

=== Chronology ===
- 1982: INDIA EXIM BANK was established on 01-January-1982, under the Export-Import Bank of India Act, 1981, with the aim of promoting and financing India's international trade.
- 1983: The first overseas representative office of INDIA EXIM BANK was established in London, England.
- 1985: INDIA EXIM BANK started providing Lines of Credit to overseas governments, enabling them to import goods and services from India on favourable credit terms.
- 1991: INDIA EXIM BANK set up an Export Development Fund to support the export activities of small and medium-sized enterprises (SMEs) in India.
- 1992: INDIA EXIM BANK launched the Buyer's credit programme, which provides competitive financing to overseas buyers of Indian goods and services.
- 1994: INDIA EXIM BANK signed an agreement with the African Development Bank to set up the India-Africa Fund to support trade and investment between India and Africa.
- 1999: INDIA EXIM BANK established the India Development Fund to provide equity and quasi-equity support to Indian companies investing overseas.
- 2003: INDIA EXIM BANK launched the Rural Initiative for Supporting Entrepreneurship (RISE) programme to support rural entrepreneurs in India.
- 2007: INDIA EXIM BANK launched the India-Africa Trade and Investment Promotion Programme to promote trade and investment between India and Africa.
- 2011: INDIA EXIM BANK launched the Project Development and Monitoring Facility to provide advisory services to Indian companies investing overseas.
- 2015: INDIA EXIM BANK signed an agreement with the Development Bank of Southern Africa to set up the India-South Africa Development Partnership Fund to support development projects in South Africa.
- 2020: INDIA EXIM BANK launched the Global Network Programme to expand its overseas footprint and provide enhanced support to Indian businesses operating overseas.
- 2024: INDIA EXIM BANK opened a representative office in Nairobi, Kenya.

== Organisation Structure ==
The Export-Import Bank of India (INDIA EXIM BANK) has a well-defined organizational structure consisting of several departments and functional units that work together to achieve the bank's objectives.

- Board of Directors: The Board of Directors is the highest decision-making body of INDIA EXIM BANK. It consists of a chairman and managing director, Executive Directors, and non-executive directors, who are appointed by the Government of India.
- Senior Management: The Senior Management team consists of the chairman and managing director, Executive Directors, and General Managers, who are responsible for the day-to-day operations of the bank.
- Business Divisions: INDIA EXIM BANK has several business divisions, including Corporate banking, Project finance, Lines of Credit, Small and Medium Enterprises (SME) Business, Export Services, Risk management, and Treasury.
- Support Functions: INDIA EXIM BANK also has several support functions, including Human resources, Information technology, Legal and Compliance, Audit, and Internal control.
- Regional Offices: INDIA EXIM BANK has 9 regional offices located in major Indian cities, which are responsible for providing financial and advisory services to Indian exporters and importers.
- Overseas Representative Offices: INDIA EXIM BANK has representative offices in Washington D.C., USA; Johannesburg, South Africa; and Yangon, Myanmar, which support the bank's operations and business development activities overseas.

=== Management ===
INDIA EXIM BANK's management:

Designation	Name
Managing Director	Ms. Harsha Bangari
Deputy Managing Director	Mr. Tarun Sharma, Ms. Deepali Agrawal
Chief General Managers	Mukul Sarkar, David Sinate, Prahalathan Iyer, Rima Marphatia, Manjiri Bhalerao, Deepali Agrawal, Tarun Sharma, Gaurav Bhandari, Utpal Gokhale, Vikramaditya Ugra
General Managers	Meena Verma, Dharmendra Sachan, Shilpa Waghmare, Uday Shinde, Lokesh Kumar, Rikesh Chand, Nirmit Ved, Meghana Joglekar, Priti Thomas, Manish Joshi, Ambrish Bhandari

== Loans and Investments ==
LOCs given by the INDIA EXIM BANK:

In March-2008, the bank provided a credit of 100 million dollars to finance a road construction project and the construction of electrical infrastructure for the government of Nepal.

In February-2019, the bank provided a credit of 200 million dollars to finance a project in the field of housing and infrastructure to the government of Uzbekistan.

In March-2019, the bank provided a credit of 83 million dollars to finance a project in the field of solar energy in the Democratic republic of Congo.

In March-2019, the bank provided a credit of 800 million dollars to finance projects in the Republic of Maldives.

In August-2019, the bank provided a credit of 38 million dollars for an industrial project, in the field of water systems, to the Republic of Mozambique.

In October-2019, the bank provided a credit of 30 million dollars to the Republic of Sierra Leone.

In November-2019, the bank provided a credit of 30 million dollars for a project to improve the fresh water infrastructure in Ghana

In January-2020, the bank provided a credit of 75 million dollars to finance a project in the field of solar energy in Cuba.

== Key people ==
Key people associated with the Export-Import Bank of India (INDIA EXIM BANK) and their roles:

Board of Directors
Position	Name
Chairman and Managing Director	Ms. Harsha Bangari
Deputy Managing Director	Mr. N. Ramesh
Secretary (ER), Ministry of External Affairs	Mr. Dammu Ravi
Additional Secretary, Department of Economic Affairs, Ministry of Finance	Mr. Rajat Kumar Mishra
Additional Secretary, Department of Financial Services, Ministry of Finance	Mr. Suchindra Misra
Joint Secretary, Department of Commerce, Ministry of Commerce & Industry	Mr. Vipul Bansal
Executive Director, Reserve Bank of India	Mr. R. Subramanian
Chairman-cum-Managing Director, ECGC Ltd.	Mr. M. Senthilnathan
Managing Director & CEO, IDBI Bank Ltd	Mr. Rakesh Sharma
Chairman, State Bank of India	Mr. Dinesh Kumar Khara
Managing Director & CEO, Bank of Maharashtra	Mr. A.S. Rajeev
Managing Director & CEO, Central Bank of India	Mr. Matam Venkata Rao
Non-Official Director	Mr. Ashok Kumar Gupta

=== Past Chief Executives ===
Sr. No.	Chief Executives of Exim Bank	Tenure
1	Mr. R.C. Shah	1982–1985
2	Mr. Kalyan Banerji	1985–1993
3	Ms. Tarjani Vakil	1993–1996
4	Mr. Y.B. Desai	1997–2001
5	Mr. T.C. Venkat Subramanian	2001–2009
6	Ms. Ravneet Kaur (additional charge)	2009–2010
7	Mr. T.C. A. Ranganathan	2010–2013
8	Mr. Anurag Jain (additional charge)	2013–2014
9	Mr. Yaduvendra Mathur	2014–2017
10	Mr. David Rasquinha	2017–2021
11	Ms. Harsha Bangari	2021–present

== Branches ==
The Export-Import Bank of India (INDIA EXIM BANK) has its headquarters in Mumbai, India. Apart from the headquarters, INDIA EXIM BANK has several branches and overseas offices to cater to the needs of Indian exporters and importers. Here are the details of INDIA EXIM BANK's branches and offices:

1. Domestic Branches: INDIA EXIM BANK has 9 domestic offices located in Mumbai, Delhi, Kolkata, Chennai, Ahmedabad, Bangalore, Hyderabad, Pune, and Guwahati.
2. Overseas Offices: INDIA EXIM BANK has 8 overseas offices located in Washington D.C. (USA), London (UK), Johannesburg (South Africa), Singapore, Tokyo (Japan), Beijing (China), Dhaka (Bangladesh), and Yangon (Myanmar).
3. Representative Offices: INDIA EXIM BANK also has representative offices in various countries to promote and facilitate India's trade relations with those countries. These representative offices are located in Abu Dhabi (UAE), Accra (Ghana), Addis Ababa (Ethiopia), Colombo (Sri Lanka), Dubai (UAE), Istanbul (Turkey) and Nairobi (Kenya).

== Subsidiaries ==
The Export-Import Bank of India (INDIA EXIM BANK) has two subsidiaries.

1. EXIM Bank Asset Management Company Ltd. (EBAMC): It was incorporated in 2015 and is headquartered in Mumbai, India. EBAMC is a wholly owned subsidiary of INDIA EXIM BANK and is registered with the Securities and Exchange Board of India (SEBI) as a Category II Alternative Investment Fund (AIF). The company manages funds in the areas of infrastructure, private equity, and other alternative asset classes.
2. Export-Import Bank of India, London Branch: It is a subsidiary of INDIA EXIM BANK and operates as INDIA EXIM BANK's London branch. The London branch was established in 2006 and is located in London, UK. It provides a range of financial services to customers in the UK, Europe, and other countries. The services offered by Export-Import Bank of India, London Branch include trade finance, project finance, corporate lending, and advisory services.
3. INDIA EXIM FINSERVE IFSC Pvt Ltd.: It was incorporated in 2023 in International Financial Services Centre, GIFT City, Gujarat.

== Functions ==
The Export-Import Bank of India (INDIA EXIM BANK) has been established with the aim of promoting and financing India's international trade. Here are the main functions and responsibilities of INDIA EXIM BANK:

- Financing: INDIA EXIM BANK provides financial assistance to Indian exporters and importers in the form of pre-shipment and post-shipment credit, buyer's credit, lines of credit, and project export finance.
- Export marketing: INDIA EXIM BANK provides advisory services and support to Indian exporters in identifying new markets and expanding their international trade.
- Export credit insurance: INDIA EXIM BANK provides export credit insurance to Indian exporters to protect them against the risks of non-payment by overseas buyers.
- Research and development: INDIA EXIM BANK conducts research and analysis on international trade and finance and provides information and intelligence to Indian businesses and policymakers.
- Collaboration: INDIA EXIM BANK collaborates with other institutions, both in India and overseas, to promote and facilitate India's international trade and investment.
- Policy advocacy: INDIA EXIM BANK represents the interests of Indian exporters and importers in international forums and advocates policies that promote India's international trade and investment.
- Lines of Credit: INDIA EXIM BANK extends lines of credit to overseas entities, including governments, financial institutions, and commercial banks, to promote India's exports and support the development of infrastructure in recipient countries.
- Project Finance: INDIA EXIM BANK provides project finance to Indian companies for executing overseas projects, especially in developing countries, to support India's international business interests.
- SME Financing: INDIA EXIM BANK provides financing and advisory services to small and medium-sized enterprises (SMEs) in India to help them enter the international market and grow their businesses.
- Capacity building: INDIA EXIM BANK conducts training and capacity-building programmes for Indian businesses and government officials to enhance their skills and knowledge related to international trade and finance.
- Corporate social responsibility (CSR): INDIA EXIM BANK has a CSR program that focuses on education, healthcare, environment, and community development. The bank supports various initiatives in India and overseas to promote sustainable development and social welfare.

== See also ==
- Exim Bank (Bangladesh)
- Exim Bank (Djibouti)
- Exim Bank (Uganda)
- Securities and Exchange Board of India
- Export–Import Bank of the United States
