= Alykhan Karmali =

Ugandan businessman (born 1968)

- Born: 1968 (age 57–58); Uganda
- Occupations: Businessman, entrepreneur, industrialist and philanthropist
- Years active: 1988–present
- Known for: Business acumen
- Title: Group Managing Director and Group CEO of Mukwano Group of Companies
- Predecessor: Amirali Karmali

Alykhan Karmali is a Ugandan entrepreneur, industrialist, and philanthropist. He is the managing director of Mukwano Industries Uganda Limited, a member company of the Mukwano Group. He also served as a non-executive director of Exim Bank (Uganda), a commercial bank in which the Mukwano Group maintains 36.5 percent stake.

== Background ==
Ali Mohamed Karmali, Alykhan's paternal grandfather, was an entrepreneur of Indian descent who migrated to Uganda circa 1904. He worked as a shop assistant in Jinja before shifting to Mbarara in Uganda's Western Region. Later, he settled in Bukandula in present-day Gomba District in the Buganda Region of Uganda, where "in partnership with other Asian families, he did a roaring trade in cotton and coffee". He had so many friends that he was locally nicknamed "Mukwano gwa Bangi" (Friend of Many). The family shortened it to "Mukwano" and named the family business after him. Amirali Karmali, Alikhan's father, died on 10 July 2019 at Kololo, an upscale neighborhood in Kampala. He was buried in a cemetery in the same neighborhood, on Saturday 13 July 2019. In 1995, Amirali handed over the family business to his son, Alykhan.
