= Overseas Economic Cooperation Fund =

The term Overseas Economic Cooperation Fund may refer to:

- the Economic Cooperation Organization (ECO), funded in 1985 by Iran, Pakistan and Turkey to improve socio-economic development
- the Overseas Economic Cooperation Fund of Japan, a foreign aid institutions of Japan (merged in 1999 to form Japan Bank for International Cooperation)
