= Water management in Greater Mexico City =

Greater Mexico City (Zona Metropolitana del Valle de México), a metropolitan area with more than 19 million inhabitants including Mexico's capital (Ciudad de México, or CDMX) with about 9 million inhabitants, faces tremendous water challenges. These include groundwater overexploitation, land subsidence, the risk of major flooding, the impacts of increasing urbanization, poor water quality, inefficient water use, a low share of wastewater treatment, health concerns about the reuse of wastewater in agriculture, and limited cost recovery. Overcoming these challenges is complicated by fragmented responsibilities for water management in Greater Mexico City:

- The Federal government is in charge of regulating the use of water resources, contributing to the financing of investments and supplying bulk water from other basins through the National Water Commission (CONAGUA);
- The State of Mexico provides bulk water, treats wastewater and assists municipalities in providing water and sanitation services in its part of Greater Mexico City;
- 59 municipal governments in the part of Greater Mexico City located in the State of Mexico and one municipality in Hidalgo State are in charge of water distribution and sanitation for their constituents;
- the government of Federal District provides water supply and sanitation services to its constituents through its water department; and
- two irrigation districts in Hidalgo state are in charge of irrigation with wastewater from Greater Mexico City.

Given the size and political importance of Greater Mexico City, a major flood or a major water supply interruption would be a national political crisis potentially threatening the stability of the federal government. The security of water supply and the functioning of the storm water drainage of the metropolitan area thus are major concerns for the local, state, district and federal governments. In response to the challenges outlined above, the Federal Government, the State of Mexico and the Federal District initiated a US$2.8 billion Water Sustainability Program in 2007.

In parallel, the government of the Federal District launched a Green Plan which includes water conservation as an important element. Investments envisaged under both plans include an increase in wastewater treatment, the import of groundwater from irrigated areas North of the city where the groundwater table increased due to irrigation with wastewater, the construction of a major new storm water drainage tunnel, increased water imports from an expansion of the energy-intensive Cutzamala system that pumps water up over more than 1000 meters, and the reduction of non-revenue water from 36% to 25%.

The Valley of Mexico encompasses the Distrito Federal (DF) and the part of Mexico State north of DF.

== Geography and climate ==
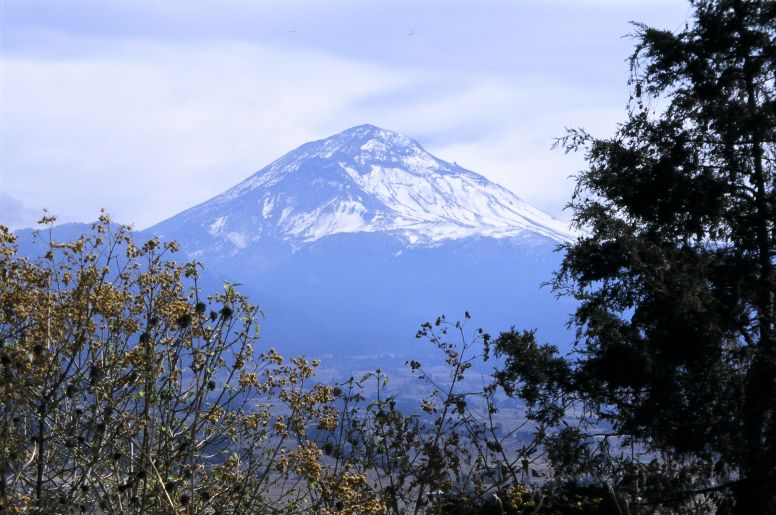
Popocatépetl, the largest peak in the mountains surrounding Mexico city.

The climate of the Valley of Mexico ranges from a semi-arid belt in the north to a tropical one in the south. The valley receives about 700 millimeters (28 in) of annual rainfall, which is concentrated from June through to September/October with little or no precipitation during the remainder of the year. There are hardly any permanent rivers today. Groundwater is the main water resource in the valley.

The valley has no natural drainage outlet for the waters that flow from the mountainsides, making the city vulnerable to flooding. It was artificially opened through the use of canals and tunnels starting in the 17th century, entirely draining what used to be Lake Texcoco. The rural southern portion of the Federal District and of the Valley of Mexico, in particular the Sierra Chichinautzin is the most important natural recharge zone for the Mexico City Aquifer due to relatively high levels of precipitation and the high permeability of its basalt rock.

== Sector responsibilities ==
Water resources management. The National Water Commission (Conagua) is responsible for water resources management in Mexico, including granting of water abstraction and wastewater discharge permits.

Water supply and sanitation. The National Water Commission also supplies bulk water to the Federal District and to parts of Mexico state through the Cutzamala and Lerma systems.

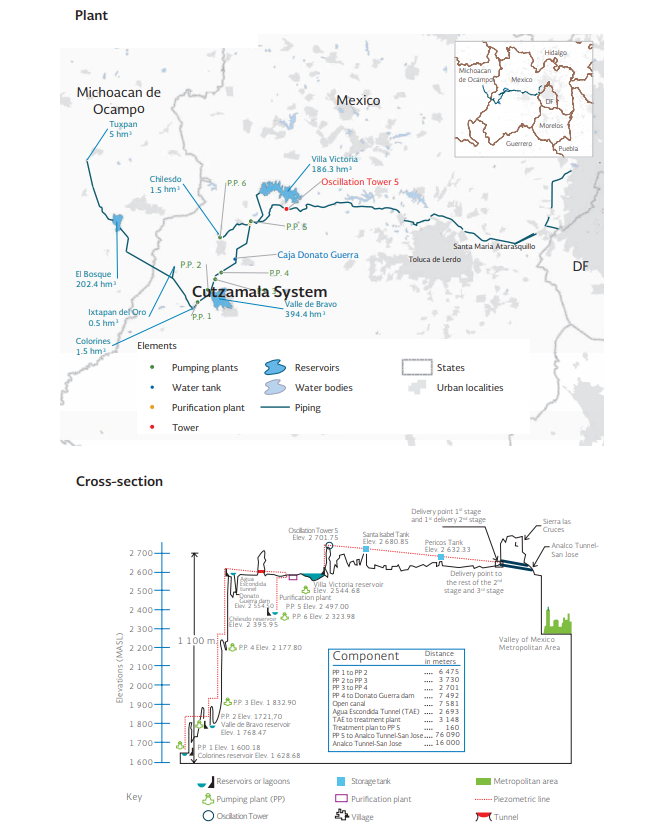
The Cutzamala System is one of the biggest drinking water supply systems in the world, because of the quantity of water that it supplies (approximately 450 million cubic meters every year), and because of the difference in elevation (1 100 m) that it has to overcome. The figure shows the location of the system and the difference in elevation that has to be overcome from the lowest point to the Metropolitan Area of the Valley of Mexico (MAVM).

In Mexico State, the State Water Commission buys bulk water from Conagua, transmits it through its own bulk water infrastructure and sells it on to 57 municipalities with 4.1 million inhabitants. The State Water Commission also monitors water quality, provides technical assistance to municipalities in water disinfection and sewer cleaning, operates wastewater pumping stations and five wastewater treatment plants, empties septic tanks and provides water in tankers in emergency situations. It also provides training and assists municipalities in the establishment of municipal utilities (organismos operadores). In the 59 municipalities of Mexico State and one municipality of the state of Hidalgo that are part of Greater Mexico City, each municipality is in charge of water supply and sanitation.

The municipal water utility of Mexico City, Sistema de Aguas de la Ciudad de México (SACM), is responsible for water supply and sanitation in the Federal District. Its head is appointed by the government of the District.

== Infrastructure ==
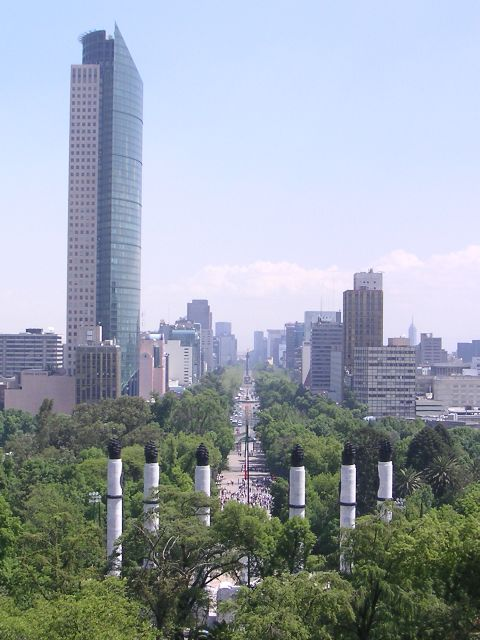
A view of Mexico City with Paseo de la Reforma and Torre Mayor.

The water infrastructure in Greater Mexico City consists of infrastructure for bulk water supply and water distribution (water supply), wastewater collection, storm water collection and wastewater treatment (sanitation), and for irrigation using mainly wastewater.

=== Water supply ===
The Federal District and State of Mexico combined had 1,089 registered wells at depths of 70 to 200 meters in 1994. This does not include wells operated by the National Water Commission, which are deeper. There are also a large number of non-registered wells, many of which are located in the State of Mexico. Wells are generally located in four different well fields. These are labeled as South (or Xochimilco), Metropolitan, East (or Texcoco region) and North well fields.

Besides these well fields, the bulk water supply infrastructure of Greater Mexico city consists of two systems: Lerma and Cutzamala. Both systems are operated by the National Water Commission.

The Lerma system, built in the 1940s, transfers 4.8 m^{3}/s of water (6% of total water supply to Greater Mexico City) from well fields in the upper basin of the Lerma River in the west to Mexico City.

The Cutzamala System was built in stages from the late 1970s to the late 1990s. It can transfer 14.9 m^{3}/s (19% of total supply) of water from the Cutzamala River in the Balsas River basin in the Southwest to Greater Mexico City for use as drinking water, lifting it over more than 1000 meters. It utilizes 7 reservoirs, a 127-km long aqueduct with 21 km of tunnels, 7.5 km of canal, and a water treatment plant. Its cost was US$1.3 billion. While providing Mexico City with over 20% of its water, the Cutzamala system currently operates at only 47% of its total capacity.

The water distribution system in the Federal District included nearly 11,000 km of distribution lines and 243 storage tanks with a capacity of 1.5 million cubic meters in 1994. Water from all the separate sources is added to the common distribution system. The Federal District also operates a water transmission line (the Acueducto Periférico) that transports water from the Cutzamala System - entering the distribution system from the west - to the southern and eastern part of the district. The State of Mexico system has nearly 800 km of distribution lines and 32 storage tanks with a capacity of 440,000 cubic meters. As of 2000, there were 2.5 million water connections with 67% of these being domestic and this only accounts for legal connections. It is estimated that there could be another 900,000 illegal connections.

The State of Mexico operates the 49-km water transmission line (the Macrocircuito) to transport water entering from the west side of the service area (including the imported water from the Cutzamala-Lerma System) to the east side. This transmission line is being upgraded to increase the volume of water taken from the Cutzamala-Lerma system to 7.3 m^{3}, and to provide service to the eastern service area. The Macrocircuito is operated by the State Water Commission.

It is expected that the dependency of Mexico City on external sources of water will increase. Additionally, the absence of economic compensation mechanisms for those communities from which water is extracted has created conflicts among users and sometimes limits water transferred to the city. One example of this is Mexico City's high use of bottled water. Those that do not have access to water from pipes, pay private vendors from 6 to 25% of their daily salaries. General distrust of tap water quality has led to much of the population purchasing drinking water; Mexico was ranked the third largest consumer of bottled water in 2009.

=== Combined sewer system ===
Greater Mexico City is served by a single combined sewer system, collecting municipal wastewater, industrial wastewater and storm water. It includes 7,400 miles (11,900 km) of pipes, 68 pumping stations, numerous dams, lagoons, and regulatory tanks for flow control, 111 km of open canals, 42 km of rivers (rio) used primarily for drainage, and 118 km of underground collectors (interceptor and emisor) and tunnels. The three interceptors are:

- The Western Interceptor (Interceptor del Poniente), draining into the Nochistongo Channel, which ultimately joins the Emisor Central;
- The Central Interceptor (Interceptor Central), draining into the Emisor Central (Drenaje Profundo) and then into the Salto River in Hidalgo state near the Requena dam, from where it flows to the Mezquital Valley; and
- The Eastern Interceptor (Interceptor del Oriente), draining into the Grand Canal, then into the old and new tunnels of Tequixquiac and ultimately to the Salado River.

The total dry weather flow for Greater Mexico City, which consists mainly of untreated municipal wastewater, was estimated at 44 m^{3}/s in 1993. During the monsoon season, the region experiences many storms of high intensity and short duration. A single storm can produce up to 70 millimeters (about 3 inches) of rainfall, representing 10 percent of the total annual precipitation. Because of this rainfall pattern, the general drainage system was designed to carry 200 m^{3}/s over a 45-hour period

Until 1910 the Grand Canal functioned purely by gravity, with an inclination of 19 cm per km. Over the next five decades its inclination declined to 10 cm per km due to land subsidence of 7 meters. Several large pumps were installed in an attempt to maintain its capacity. After heavy floods in 1950 and 1951 it became clear that the Grand Canal could not protect the city any more from flooding and a deep drainage system (Drenaje profundo) was proposed for the first time. Studies on the system began in 1959; its construction began in 1967 and it was completed in 1975. It consists of a deep tunnel, the Emisor Central with a length of 68 km and a depth of up to 250 m. It today constitutes by far the most important element of the Mexico City drainage system. It was designed for a flow of 170 m^{3}/s.

Due to further land settlement the inclination in the Grand Canal became zero by 1990 and negative by 2000. Despite the installation of further pumps, the capacity of the Grand Canal thus declined from 80 m^{3}/s in 1975 to 15 m^{3}/s in 2008. This in turn affected the Emisor Central, which had been designed to be closed during the winter for maintenance. Because of the settlement of the grand canal the Emisor Central was continuously filled with water, making it impossible to inspect it for problems or to maintain it, making maintenance impossible between 1995 and 2008. The tunnel has been damaged by overwork and corrosion of its 20 ft (6 m) diameter walls and its capacity has been reduced to 120 m^{3}/s. In 2008 it was maintained for the first time in more than 12 years.

Overall, the combined discharge capacity of the system has declined from 280 m^{3}/s in 1975 to 165 m^{3}/s in 2008. The Nochistongo Channel is the only element of the system whose capacity remains undiminished at 30 m^{3}/s.

=== Wastewater treatment ===
Only about 15% of the wastewater collected in Greater Mexico City was treated in 2008, mostly in wastewater treatment plants in Mexico state. Currently, the metropolitan area generates 40 m^{3}/s of wastewater; however capacity is only built to handle 10 m^{3}/s. The treated wastewater is for local reuse projects such as ground water recharge and agricultural and urban-landscape irrigation. There were 13 wastewater treatment plants in the Federal District and 14 in the State of Mexico service area in 1994, treating a total flow of 2.62 and 1.69 m^{3}/s respectively. The untreated portion of the wastewater is discharged to the drainage system, from where it is discharged to the North where it is being reused in irrigated agriculture.

=== Reuse in irrigated agriculture ===
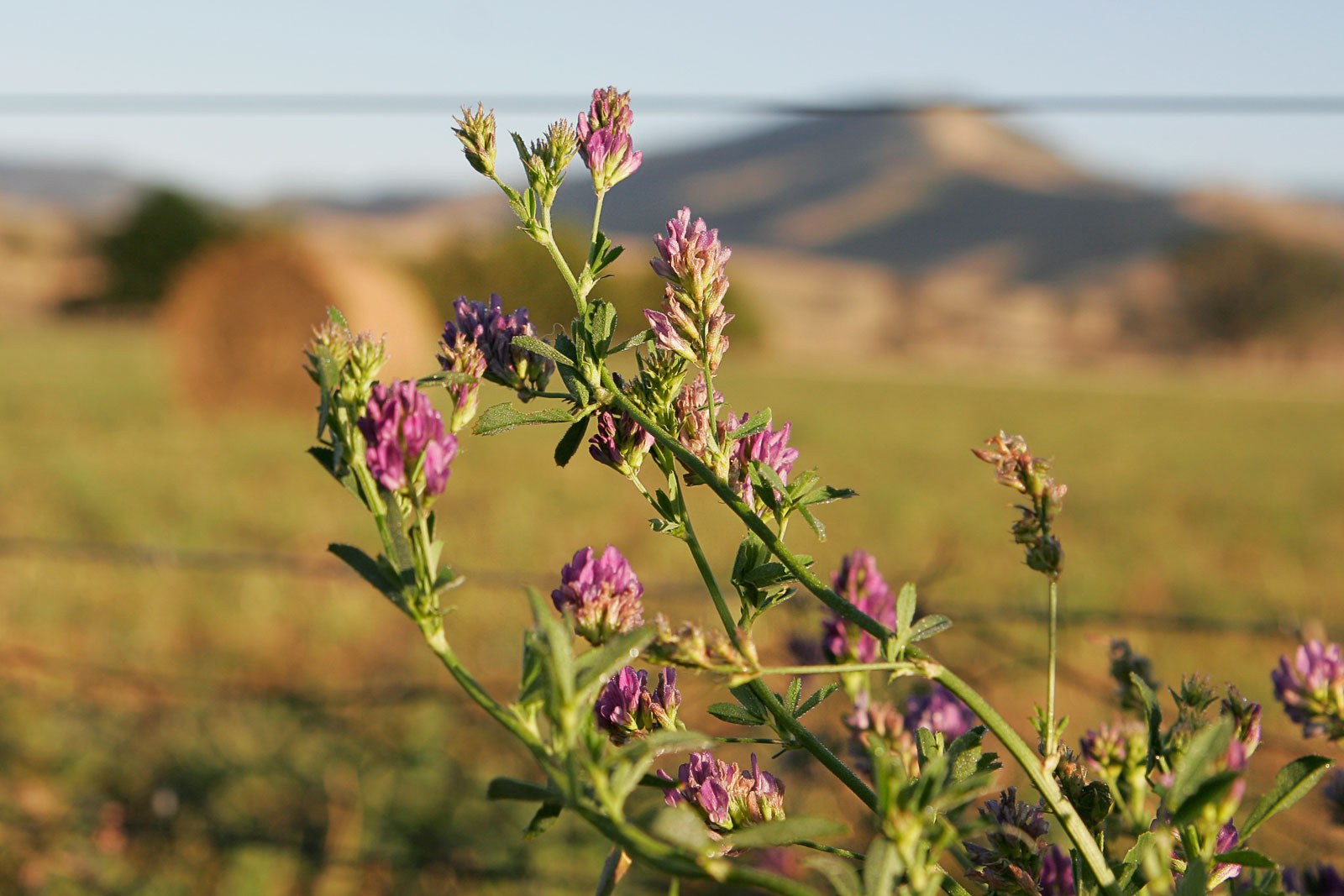
The fodder crop Alfalfa is the main crop irrigated with wastewater from Mexico City.

Large-scale irrigation infrastructure was built in the state of Hidalgo to distribute storm water and wastewater from Mexico City for the irrigation of Alfalfa as the main crop, as well as barley, wheat and corn. Thanks to the nutrients in the sewage, alfalfa yields are more than 100 tons per hectare, compared to the national average of 68-74 tons. Alfalfa is planted year-round, providing 9-10 harvests per planting, and is sold to livestock operations in other states. The infrastructure is operated and maintained by Irrigation districts No. 3 Tula and No. 100 Alfajayucan in the Mezquital Valley. They used to be operated by Conagua, but were transferred to water user associations during the 1990s.

The cultivated area is 83,000 hectare, about half the size of the U.S. state of Rhode Island. Wastewater has been used there since 1912. The wastewater, whether raw, partially treated or mixed with rainfall, is highly valued by the farmers because of its ability to improve soil quality and because of its nutrient load that allows increased productivity. However, the wastewater is contaminated with pathogenic organisms and toxic chemicals that constitute a health risk for both farmers and consumers of agricultural products.

=== Reuse for other purposes ===
Water reuse activities in Greater Mexico City officially began in 1984 under the National Program for Efficient Use of Water. This national program included the establishment of new wastewater discharge regulations by the Federal District, and in 1990, provisions were established for an industrial pretreatment program - an important prerequisite for any reclamation and reuse activity. Little information is available on the extent and success of industrial pretreatment programs.

Within the Federal District service area, in 1995 the 2.62 m^{3}/s of treated reused wastewater is distributed as follows:

- 83 percent for urban landscape irrigation and recreational impoundments,
- 10 percent for industrial uses,
- 5 percent for agricultural irrigation, and
- 2 percent for commercial uses such as car washing.

Recreational impoundments. A major wastewater reclamation and reuse scheme exists at Lake Texcoco in conjunction with programs for flood control and dust abatement. Between flooding, the shallow, saline lake bed would dry and produce severe dust storms. In response to this problem, the Texcoco Plan was established in 1971. The solution was to create smaller, more permanent ponds within the large, intermittent lake bed, and to rehabilitate the problem areas for further urban and agricultural expansion through windbreaks, revegetation, agricultural irrigation, and drainage improvements.

The artificial and more permanent lakes were created using lessons learned from the subsidence problem. High rates of pumping consolidated the clays and lowered the old lake bed by about 4 meters in places. The reuse component of the Texcoco plans include the construction of a facultative lagoon wastewater treatment system, and reclamation of the collected storm water for agricultural irrigation. Thus, the potable water currently used for this purpose will be replaced.

Industrial reuse. Industries recycle and reuse wastewater generated by themselves or by municipalities. For example, 26 private companies in the Vallejo area initiated a reuse program in 1989 by establishing a for-profit firm, Aguas Industriales de Vallejo. The firm rehabilitated an old municipal wastewater treatment plant and distributes reclaimed water to its shareholder companies at three-quarters of the cost of government supplied potable water.

Pilot project for potable reuse. The Federal District constructed two pilot treatment plants in 1983 to study the potential for the advanced wastewater treatment of secondary effluent for potable reuse, and to examine the potential for treating contaminated ground water. Based upon results of the experimental treatment plants, a new treatment facility was constructed, with a capacity of 0.3 m^{3}/s, and designed for both ground water treatment and direct potable reuse. The established goal of the reuse project was to blend the reclaimed wastewater with treated ground water and add it directly into the distribution system Currently, the reclaimed wastewater is being used for non-potable purposes.

=== Artificial ground water recharge ===
Artificial ground water recharge is being practiced in Greater Mexico City using both flood water and treated wastewater.

Floodwater. Artificial floodwater recharge has been practiced in the region since 1943, as a method to alleviate flooding rather than as a method to recharge groundwater. Early projects involved runoff retention and surface spreading, channel modification, and infiltration wells. Many of these projects were done in the highly permeable basalt of the upland areas and achieved very high rates of infiltration during periods of heavy rains.

Artificial recharge of floodwater using injection wells was first developed in the Federal District around 1953. Half of the wells were subsequently closed due to operational problems. In 1970, a series of approximately 56 wells was developed for the purposes of disposing of stormwater. These wells were capable of handling up to 35 m^{3}/s of water collectively. Although the wells were not designed for recharge purposes, the storm water possibly reached the aquifer.

Treated wastewater. The Texcoco Project mentioned above has carried out studies on indirect potable reuse of reclaimed wastewater through artificial recharge of the aquifer using secondary and advanced treatment of municipal wastewater. The final effluent may be used in either infiltration ponds or injection wells. In a separate program carried out by the Federal District, a pilot plant injected advanced treated water directly into the aquifer at a rate of up to 0.05 m^{3}/s. Monitoring wells were used to gauge changes in water quality and pressure levels.

== Water challenges ==
These include groundwater overexploitation, land subsidence, the risk of major flooding, the impacts of increasing urbanization, poor water quality and intermittent supply, inefficient water use, a low share of wastewater treatment, health concerns about the reuse of wastewater for irrigation, and limited cost recovery for water. Infrastructure coverage in terms of access to a piped water connection or to sanitation, which is used to monitor the Millennium Development Goals for water supply and sanitation, is almost universal in Greater Mexico City and as such does not constitute a challenge.

=== Groundwater overexploitation ===
The Greater Mexico City's exponential population growth has depleted its groundwater resources. Currently, 4 of the 14 aquifers in the Valley of Mexico basin are overexploited. The per capita rechargeable water available for the Valley of México in 2010 is calculated at 163 m^{3}, whereas in 2030, it is predicted that rechargeable water per capita will be 148 m^{3}. Recharge of the aquifer is about 31.6 m^{3}/s compared to abstraction of 59.5 m^{3}/s, resulting in an overdraft of about 28 m^{3}/s.

In 1983 systematic monitoring of the water levels in the aquifer began. Since that time, the average annual declines in ground water levels range from 0.1 to 1.5 meters per year in different zones. At the current rate of depletion, it has been calculated that the estimated volume of storage corresponds to between 200 and 350 times the annual abstraction. However, a simplistic water balance approach does not account for other realities. For example, the aquifer is vulnerable to geologically-induced water quality problems with increasing aquifer depth and consolidation and fracturing of clay layers. Furthermore, the actual volume available in the main aquifer would likely be less than estimated because of probable decreasing porosity with increasing depth. Also, there are practical, economic limits to the depth of pumping.

The water balance of Greater Mexico is as follows:

	Water sources
Groundwater	59.5 m^{3}/s
Import from Lerma basin	4.8 m^{3}/s
Import Cutzamala system	14.9 m^{3}/s
Rivers and springs	2.7 m^{3}/s
Total	81.9 m^{3}/s

	Water use
Municipal use	64.7 m^{3}/s
Industrial use	4.6 m^{3}/s
Agricultural use	12.6 m^{3}/s
Total	81.9 m^{3}/s

=== Land subsidence ===
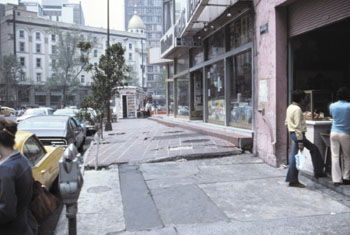
Subsidence in Mexico City.

Mexico City's water balance has a 6 m^{3}/second aquifer deficit, which has caused the drying up of the heavily saturated clay of the former Lake Texcoco (on which the city rests on) and has led to land subsidence. Land subsidence has been caused by groundwater overexploitation during the last hundred years, and has been up to 9 meters, resulting in damages to buildings, streets, sidewalks, sewers, storm water drains and other infrastructure. The collapse in the central region of the city reached 10m at the end of the 20th century, while in the sub-basin Chalco-Xochimilco, it reached 7m. Current subsidence rates lie between five and 40 cm/year.

=== Flooding ===
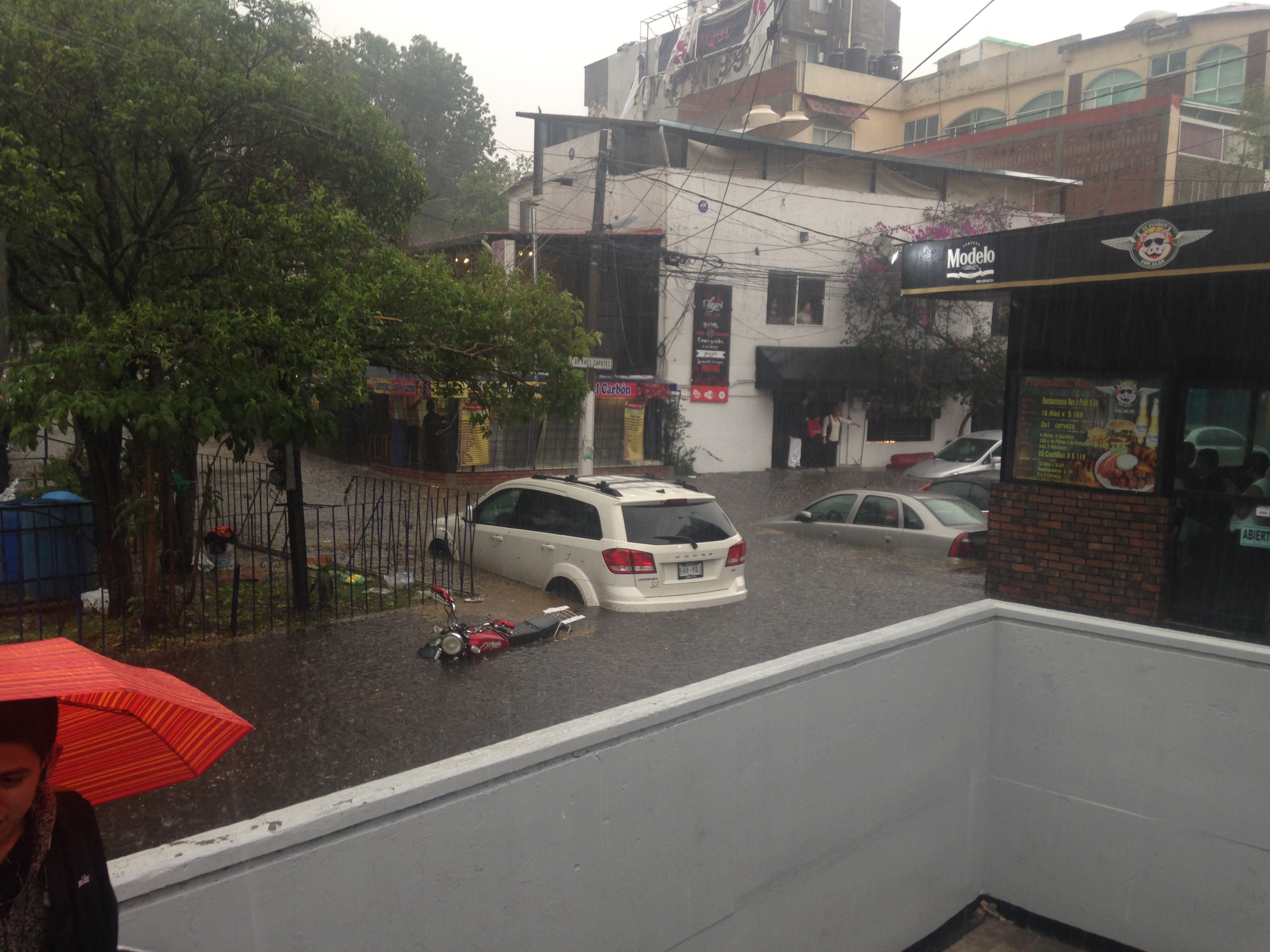
Rainfall at Copilco Station, Mexico City, May 4, 2017

The Mexico Valley Basin has faced droughts, recurrent floods and other hydrological and climate-related hazards since pre-Hispanic and colonial times. It is particularly vulnerable to floods because it is a naturally enclosed basin and because very few natural drainage basins remain, as many of the aquifer system streams and rivers have either dried up or encased and converted into sewers. The hydrological cycle used to be in equilibrium; elevated mixed forests interacted with infiltration, evapotranspiration, and with the system of rivers, seasonal streams and lakes that acted as watersheds, or drainage basins, for precipitation runoff. The monsoon season is characterized by high intensity storms of short duration, averaging 800 mm of annual precipitation (although this spreads differently by region: 500 mm in the east and 1000 mm in the west and south). Additionally, the high speed at which abundant surface runoff runs down the valley's slopes poses a big risk for nearby populations.

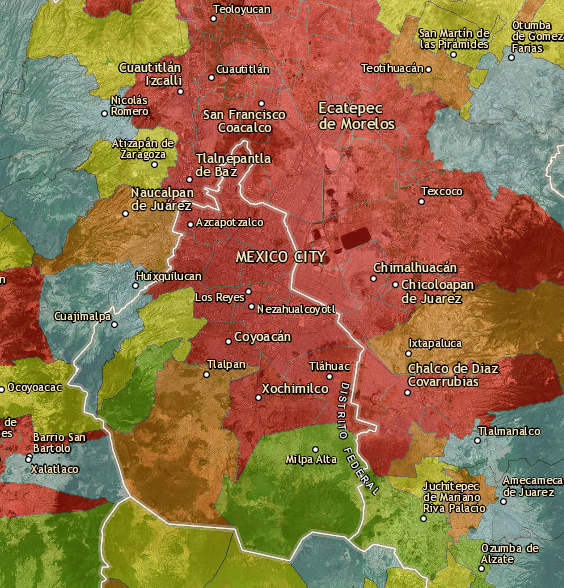
Danger index due to flood (CENAPRED, 2016). Red: very high - Orange: high - Yellow: medium - Green: low - Blue: very low

Most of the floods in the Valley can be explained due to the difference in altitude and the inability of the sewerage system to pump the water out during the monsoon season. The Great Canal has lost its gradient due to land subsidence in some parts of the city, losing its discharge capacity from 90 m³/second to 12 m³/second in the last 30 years, and the secondary sewerage network is insufficient to carry high volumes of stormwater and wastewater. This situation has resulted in chronic flooding, on occasions, even of wastewater. Poor neighborhoods located in hillsides are particularly affected by waterborne, diseases, suspension of electricity service and need for piped water supply. A total of 668 floods have been recorded throughout the 1980-2000 period, for which a total of 2,771,284 people have needed immediate assistance (including evacuation and displacement). During this period, some of the municipalities that have had the most floods have been Ecatepec (8.68%), Iztapalapa (7.93%) and Chalco (6.44%), although Tultitlan and Chimalhuacan have been the most affected in terms of Urban growth reduces the permeability of the soil in groundwater recharge areas and increases the risk of flooding. people (36.09% and 32.7%, respectively).

In low-lying neighborhoods such as Iztapalapa, residents are so accustomed to seeing a fetid sea of sewage rise in the streets that they have built miniature dikes in front of their homes. Flooding is caused both by the sinking together and increased soil impermeability due to urbanization. If the Emisor Central should fail during the monsoon season, modelling shows that a major flood would occur that would inundate the historic center, the Mexico City International Airport and the eastern boroughs of Mexico City.

=== Increasing urbanization ===
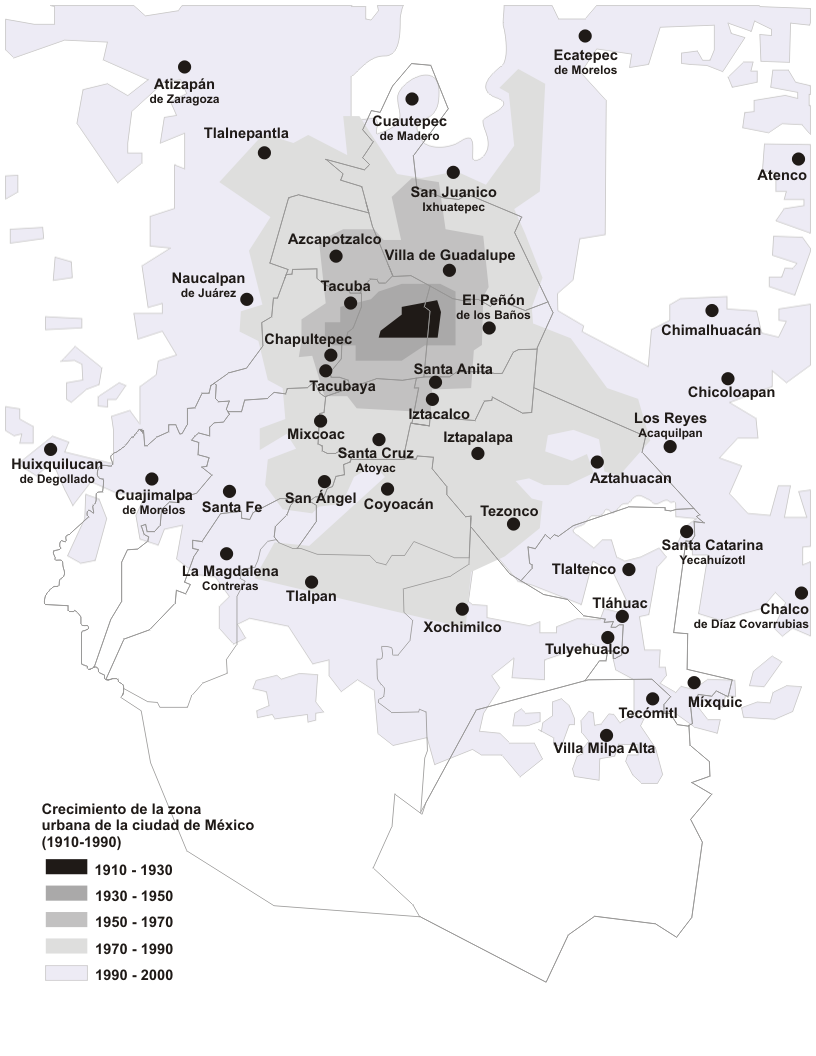
Urban growth of Mexico City (1910-1990)

It is estimated that the metropolitan area grows annually by 200 to 300 hectares on recharge areas. With every square meter that is built up, on average 170 liters of annual recharge are lost. Thus, for every hectare built up, the water for 500 families are lost and the pressure on groundwater increases further.

It is estimated that the amount of rain water that enters the basin (215 m^{3}/second) and the amount that evaporates (160 m^{3}/second) has remained the same since precolonial times. Nevertheless, the recharge rate has reduced considerably due to deforestation and urban growth. Both elements reduce the permeability of the soil in groundwater recharge areas and increases the risk of flooding.

To prevent urbanization, a total of 182 Federally Protected Natural Areas (NPA) have been declared throughout the country and cover 90,893,522 hectares. Additionally, state protected areas exists: Mexico City has a total of 23 NPAs, covering a total of 26,047 hectares. The State of Mexico has a total of 88 NPAs, covering a total of 983,984 hectares. Despite this, the Mexico City Metropolitan Area (MCMA) has grown physically and demographically since the 1930s. It spreads over a surface of 4,250 km^{2} and has a metropolitan population of approximately 21.2 million, concentrating 18% of the country's population. It covers over 16 boroughs of Mexico City and 34 municipalities of State of Mexico.

Additionally, the growth of the city has created a very large and complex hydraulic system fed from 3 different water bodies (the aquifer of Mexico Valley (70%), Lerma-Balsas river basin (9%) and Cutzemala river basin (21%)), where 40% of the water in the network is lost due leakages and illegal connections. The daily mean water provision is 315 liters/inhabitant/day in Mexico City and 135-195 liters/inhabitant/day in State of Mexico, but it is estimated that in wealthy areas, people use up to 600 liters per capita, while in poor ones, the use is only around 20 liters.

=== Water quality and intermittent supply ===
Water quality. Poor water quality is a concern both at the source and at the point of use. Groundwater below Mexico City was initially believed to be protected from contamination by a thick impervious layer. However, this layer has fractured due to land subsidence. Furthermore, the natural upward flow of water in the artesian aquifer has now been reversed due to groundwater depletion. The Groundwater under Mexico City thus is believed to be increasingly vulnerable to contaminants from waste dumps and industrial sites leaching to the aquifer. Furthermore, the deep drainage system penetrates below the clay aquitard in some places into the main aquifer. During periods of heavy rain, waste water seeps out from the deep tunnels into the surrounding subsoil contaminating the aquifer.

Untreated wastewater is also disposed of in surrounding rivers that run to the sea, but this runoff water polluted with untreated waste water is also used for irrigation as farmers have found that the high concentration of nitrogen and phosphorus nutrients effectively fertilize their crops and increase crop yields. Though there is a national norm regulating pollution limits in untreated waste water, CONAGUA reported that the Valley of Mexico basin had 50% heavily contaminated, 25% contaminated, 20.8% acceptable, and only 4.2% excellent water quality based on Biochemical Oxygen Demand (BOD) levels sampled at selected sites.

Leaks in the distribution system are a major cause of concern for drinking water quality. When the soil is permeated by sewage from leaking sewers or from other sources, then leaky pipelines will be infiltrated with contaminated water when pressure is low. According to the Federal District's water quality laboratory, neighborhoods that experience more frequent interruptions in service have poorer quality water compared to neighborhoods with a constant supply. The percent of household tap samples in compliance with the residual chlorine standard (0.2 milligrams/liter) ranged from 87 to 100 percent in tests undertaken in 1993 and was notably low among southeastern counties (Iztapalapa, Tláhuac, and Xochimilco).

Household water storage tanks, or tinácos, are common on almost all household rooftops and are used to store water when water pressure in the system is inadequate. In many instances, the tanks are open and not cleaned regularly, permitting the residual chlorine to dissipate and encouraging the growth of microorganisms. The standard levels of chlorine (0.2 milligrams/liters) maintained in the distribution system as it reaches the customer's tap are not sufficient to inactivate microorganisms that may have entered the pipelines.

Intermittent supply. Water supply in many parts of Greater Mexico City is intermittent and pressure is often insufficient. Users thus have to complement their water supply with water bought from tanker trucks, or pipas. Occasionally water supply is cut for several days, as occurred in January 2009 when the water supply from the Cutzamala system had to be reduced cutting water to 5.5 million people for three days.

This incident was followed by a second supply cut in March 2009, and most recently a third cut in April 2009. This third cut was done in response to alarmingly low levels in the city's water reserves, and reparations being undertaken on the Cutzamala system. It lasted 36 hours, and left over five million city residents without water services. In response, the Mexico City government has had to implement an emergency supply response program, providing water in tanker trucks and bottles to residents of the affected communities.

=== Limited wastewater treatment and concerns about reuse for irrigation ===
As mentioned above, only 15% of the wastewater in Greater Mexico City currently receives treatment. Storm water, untreated municipal wastewater and partially treated industrial wastewater mix with each other and are reused for irrigation on a large scale.

There are concerns about the health and environmental impacts of the reuse of untreated wastewater from Mexico City for irrigation. Crops to be grown using wastewater are restricted to crops not eaten raw, but these restrictions are difficult to enforce and farmers also grow vegetables using wastewater. According to a study by the International Water Management Institute (IWMI), these risks need to be carefully considered, but the importance of this practice for the livelihoods of countless smallholders must also be taken into account.

Studies on soils irrigated with untreated wastewater for 50 years show an accumulation of heavy metals in the soil, but also that they accumulated in plants to a lower extent. Another study found bacterial contamination of canal water used for bathing and of groundwater used for drinking water supply in the irrigated areas where wastewater was being reused, resulting in a high incidence of diarrhea and skin irritations.

=== Inefficient urban water use ===
The Federal District had a level of non-revenue water of 40%, close to the Mexican average, meaning that only 60% of the water pumped into the system is actually being billed for. A large share of non-revenue water is due not to leakage, but to illegal connections. Furthermore, SACM, the water department of the District, has by far the lowest collection efficiency among the 25 major municipalities, with only 40% of all bills being paid. Thus only 24% (60% is being billed, 40% of the bills being paid) of the water pumped into the system is being paid for. The level of non-revenue water in Mexico State is lower, so that the average level in the metropolitan area is 36%.

Per capita water use figures are difficult to compare over time, because sources typically do not indicate if water losses are included in the figures or not. The National Statistical Institute gives water use in the Federal District at 223 liter/day in 1999 (probably after losses), including 164 liter of residential use and 59 liter for industrial and commercial uses. This is only about one third of average water use in the United States, which is 603 liter/capita/day. However, it is still one third higher than water use in France, which is only 165 liter/capita/day.

Another source gives average per capita water use in 1994 as 364 and 230 liters per day for the Federal District and Mexico State respectively (probably before losses). Authorities attribute the larger per capita use in the Federal District to the fact that the Federal District is more developed and includes more commercial and industrial activity than the State of Mexico. However, lower tariffs and lower metering in the Federal District may also influence the higher water use.

=== Limited cost recovery ===
There is a major gap between the cost of supplying water, a quarter of which is imported through expensive interbasin transfers from the Lerma and Balsas basins, and what is recovered from users. Reasons for low cost recovery include illegal water connections, low tariffs and poor bill collection, in particular in the Federal District.

Cost recovery in Mexico State is much higher than in the Federal District. For example, the city of Toluca in Mexico State charges residential users 8.7 pesos (US$0.70)/ m^{3} for a consumption of 30 m^{3}. This still falls short of the cost of bulk water from the Cutzamala system at nearly 10 pesos (US$0.78)/ m^{3}, without taking into account the cost of distributing water and of sanitation. Furthermore, it is estimated than 1/3 of the water connections in the region are informal and therefore this consumption is not billed. Water price is differentiated according to their demand, increasing with higher consumption. Additionally water price was substantially reduced for low consumption users since 1996.

In 2011 the Federal District charged residential users 15.6 pesos (US$1.25)/ m^{3} for the same consumption without any surcharge for sanitation, the fourth-highest among the same municipalities. The remainder is effectively subsidized by the municipal and federal governments. In August 2007 a conflict had erupted between Conagua and the Federal District when Conagua increased the tariff for water supplied through the Cutzamala system and the District refused to accept the increase.

=== Social impact of water crisis ===
The human rights commission of the District (CDHDF) warned in summer 2009 that water shortage could cause a "spiral of violence" and that low-income families are paying more for water of lower quality and only receive it at certain hours of the day. This situation causes "social unrest". In early August 2009, the head of Conagua, José Luis Luege, had announced an "imminent and indefinite increase in water rationing in the Valley of Mexico and federal district." Because water from Cutzamala and Lerma systems, supplying together one quarter of the metropolitan area's water, enters the city from the Northwest where wealthier neighborhoods predominate, water supply tends to be more continuous than in the Southeast of the city where most of the poor live.

Mexico has shown limited results in its implementation of socially differentiated price systems and cross-subsidies. There is an important limitation caused by the fact that the poor population does not have formal access to drinking water and is thereby forced to buy drinking water from informal water vendors. The informal market is not affected by the subsidies and furthermore tends to be even more expensive than the formal market price.

== Response to challenges ==
In response to these challenges, two major programs are underway. The National Water Commission has launched a massive US$2.8 billion Water Sustainability Program in 2007 for bulk water supply, drainage and wastewater treatment for the period 2007-2012. In parallel, the government of the Federal District has launched a 15-year Green Plan that also includes drainage and wastewater treatment. In addition it emphasizes water conservation and water reuse through aquifer recharge. Both plans aim at reducing non-revenue water.

=== Water Sustainability Program ===
In November 2009, President Felipe Calderón launched a US$2.8 billion Water Sustainability Program for the Valley of Mexico through 2012. The program amplifies the earlier Program for the Sanitation of the Valley of Mexico. Its objectives are to avoid major floods such as the 2007 Tabasco flood, to treat all the wastewater collected, and to reduce groundwater overexploitation.

Water supply and exchange. 14 m^{3}/s more water would be mobilized from various sources. The largest of these imports (5 m^{3}/s) will consist of groundwater from the Tula Valley North of Greater Mexico, where the groundwater table has increased from many years of irrigation with untreated wastewater, at a cost of US$255 million. The second-largest source of additional water will be mobilized through an exchange of treated wastewater for clean water at present used for irrigation in the Vaso del Christo area (4 m^{3}/s), at a cost of 140 million. As part of the "rehabilitation" of existing sources, the Cutzamala system is expected to be expanded by 3 m^{3}/s, at a cost of US$275 million. Finally, 2 m^{3}/s would be made available from the Guadelupe dam in Mexico state at a cost of US$40 million.

Storm water drainage and wastewater treatment. The program foresees the construction of the Emisor Oriente in parallel to the Emisor Central. In February 2009, Conagua oversaw the purchase of the first of three underground drills from German firm Herrenknecht. The new drill will be used to begin excavations for the tunnel in April 2009. The tunnel will be 62 km long, 7 meters in diameter, and have a capacity of draining 150 m^{3}/s wastewater. All works on the tunnel system are expected to be completed in September 2012, at an expected cost of MXP 13 billion (approx. USD 1 billion).

Out of the discharge of the Emisor Oriental 23 m^{3}/s would be treated in a planned wastewater treatment plant in El Salto in Hidalgo State to deliver water to the Tula Irrigation District. Almost half of the investment (US$1.28 bn) will be for the construction of 6 wastewater treatment plants, the largest of which by far would be the Atotonilco (El Salto) plant. The US$900m contract to finance, build and operate the plant, allegedly the largest wastewater treatment plant in the world, was awarded in 2010 to a consortium led by the Spanish company Acciona. The plant has a nominal treatment capacity of 23 m^{3}/second, with an additional capacity for periods of high rainfall of 12 m^{3}/second.

The achievement of the program objective to both supply a growing population with water and to reduce pressure on the aquifer rests on the assumption that leakage will be reduced from 36% in 2005 to 25% in 2030.

Financing. The program is being financed from the following sources:

- Private sector:The wastewater treatment plants are partly financed by the private sector through equity and debt under Build-Operate-Transfer (BOT) projects
- Federal government: The federal government directly finances some of the works, executed by Conagua
- The Trust Fund No. 1928, created by the Federal District, the State of Mexico and the Federal Government, will finance part of the works. The Trust Fund is replenished by the payments made by the Federal District and the State of Mexico for bulk water supplied to them by Conagua. It is administered financially by the public infrastructure Bank Banobras, with Conagua acting as technical coordinator. The Trust Fund was modified in November 2008 to allow the financing of a broader range of projects.
- A Metropolitan Fund, or National Infrastructure Fund, established at the national level for infrastructure investments, also finances some works
- Loans from the state-owned investment bank Banobras.

=== Green Plan ===
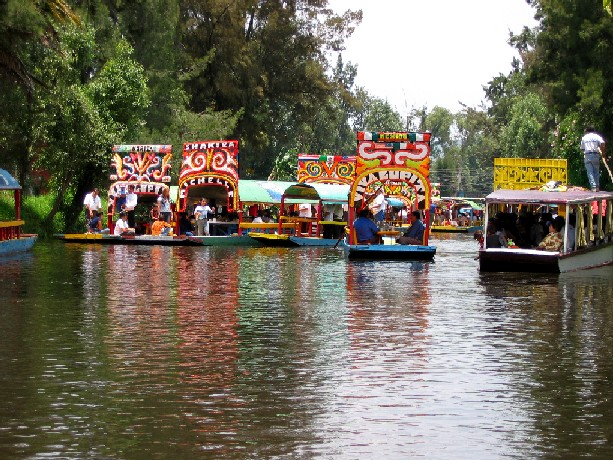
Canals in Xochimilco.

Complementing the SARP, the Federal District launched in 2007 a 15-year Green Plan (Plan Verde) that aims at the sustainable development of the District along seven major axes, one of which is water. In 2008 it had a budget of US$6 million. Concerning water, it foresees reaching an equilibrium in the aquifer, reducing residential water use, reducing network losses, increasing the reuse and the treatment of wastewater, and the creation of parks around the lakes Tláhuac and Xochimilco.

More specifically, it foresees increased aquifer recharge through changes in land use and recharge wells; the metering of all users by 2010 and making all users pay for water; identify and regularize illegal connections; the construction of tertiary wastewater treatment plants for the injection of treated wastewater into the aquifer. The Plan is expected to relieve pressure on the aquifer by 6.8 m^{3}/s, including 3.3 m^{3}/s by reducing leakage, 1 m^{3}/s through water conservation and 2.5 m^{3}/s by recharging groundwater with treated wastewater.

These measures together, if successful, would reduce groundwater abstraction in Greater Mexico by 10% and the overdraft by 25%. They would still fall short from establishing an equilibrium between abstraction and recharge.

=== Enhanced private sector participation in the Federal District from 2010 onwards ===
In mid-2009 the finance chief of the Federal District, Mario Delgado, and the director general of the District's water company SACM announced that from mid-2010 onwards the District intends to enhance the participation of the private sector in water supply through concessions, under which the concessionnaires would buy bulk water and distribute it, thus providing an incentive to reduce non-revenue water. A total of four concession covering 11 of the District's 16 delegaciones would be bid out. The concessions would replace the existing four service contracts for metering and billing.

=== Rainwater harvesting ===
In 2003, the Water Law was enacted in Mexico City. It mandates that new building constructions accommodate practices of rainwater harvesting and promotes this practice in previous buildings. It also states that in certain zones (Zone 1 and 2, according to the Construction Regulation of Mexico City), it is also obligatory that buildings have a stormwater harvest and recharge system, especially if near green areas, to promote infiltration. Finally, it also states that recreational or free areas must be covered with permeable materials.

== Past responses to challenges ==
Past responses to the water challenges facing Greater Mexico City included an ambitious water conservation campaign initiated in 1989, as well as an increase in metering and a reduction in leakage through private sector participation begun in the early 1990s.

=== Water conservation program in the 1990s ===
In 1989, in parallel with the introduction of stricter national water efficiency standards for household appliances, Mexico City launched an ambitious program to replace conventional toilets (using 16 liters) with 6-liter models, replacing 350,000 toilets by 1991. The program also included a large-scale public information campaign and an increase in water tariffs. The impact of the program is difficult to assess, since available figures on water consumption are difficult to compare over the years, because it is not clear whether they include water losses or not and whether they refer only to residential consumption or total consumption.

=== Private sector participation in the Federal District since 1993 ===
Manuel Camacho Solís, the Head of Government of the Federal District from 1988 to 1997 who was appointed by President Carlos Salinas (PRI), led the process of private sector participation in water supply in Mexico City in the early 1990s. At that time water revenues were extremely low, there was no functioning customer database, virtually no metering, and low bill collection efficiency. At least 22% of customers did not receive bills at all, partly because water connections were carried out by one department and billing by another which did not receive any information about water connections from the former.

In November 1992 bids were launched, in March 1993 the results were announced and in November 10-year service contracts were signed with four firms, each for one block of the capital:

- Block 1 with four boroughs in the North was awarded to SAPSA (Servicios de Agua Potable S.A.), constituted by the large Mexican construction firm Ingenieros Civiles Asociados (ICA), with the Bank Banamex and the French firm Générales Des Eaux (Vivendi),
- Block 2 with three boroughs in the center was awarded to IASA, (Industrias del Agua S.A.), which included businessmen from Monterrey and the British firm Severn Trent
- Block 3 with the impoverished Southeast was attributed to TECSA (Tecnología y Servicios de Agua S.A.), which included Bancomer, Bufete Industrial, and the French firm Lyonnaise Des Eaux-Dumex (SUEZ-Ondeo Services) as well as the British firm Anglian Water.
- Block 4 with five wealthy delegations in the Southwest was awarded to AMSA (Agua de México S.A.), which included the GUTSA group and the British firm North West Water International.

The process of private sector participation foresaw three phases:

- First phase (1994–1995): Updating of the user registry.
- Second phase (1995–1998): Meter reading, billing, and some aspects of collection.
- Third phase (1998–2003): Leak detection and repair, extension and rehabilitation of the secondary distribution network.

The city remained in charge of the water production, treatment and main distribution infrastructure, as well as some aspects of collection and the sanitation infrastructure. It also set water tariffs. The first two phases were successful. Under the contracts the number of metered connections increased from virtually none in 1994 to up to 1,264,500 in 2002, reaching more than 90% of all users. The third phase, however, was less successful.

Between 1994 and 1998 the amount billed increased by almost 30% in real terms. But the amount collected stagnated, since private operators were not in charge of bill collection. Collection efficiency actually declined from 84% to 69% The service itself remained unchanged in terms of intermittency of supply and water quality, since these aspects were not part of the contracts. Tariffs and cost recovery also remained unchanged, with revenues covering less than 75% of operating costs. The third phase of turning over increased responsibility to the private sector was abandoned after the PRD won elections in 1997 and renegotiated the contracts.

The PRD mayor Andrés Manuel López Obrador (2000–2005) renewed the contracts in 2004 for another five years. His successor Alejandro Encinas Rodríguez initially announced that the District would terminate the contracts even before they expired, but his successor Marcelo Ebrard actually extended them for another year until mid-2010.

=== Valley of Mexico Sanitation Project ===
In 1996 the Inter-American Development Bank (IDB) approved a US$365 million loan for the Valley of Mexico Sanitation Project, in parallel with a loan of US$410 million by the Overseas Economic Cooperation Fund of Japan. The IDB project, which closed in 2005, foresaw the construction of 4 wastewater treatment plants with a total capacity of 74.5 m^{3}/s as well as the rehabilitation of drainage systems.

== See also ==
- Water supply and sanitation in Mexico
- Water resources management in Mexico
