= AFFF =

AFFF may refer to:

== Film festivals ==
- Asian Festival of First Films, a former film festival held in Singapore
- Imagine Film Festival, formerly Amsterdam Fantastic Film Festival

== Other ==
- Adolf Fredriks Föräldraförening, the parent-teacher association at Adolf Fredrik's Music School, Stockholm, Sweden
- Advanced Fuel Fabrication Facility, BARC, at Tarapur, Maharashtra, India
- Agriculture, Forestry, Fisheries and Food Business Unit of Japan Finance Corporation in Tokyo, Japan
- Aqueous film forming foam, or aqueous fire fighting foam
- Australian Farmers' Fighting Fund, a body providing financial, legal, and professional assistance to farmers in Australia
