= Amirali Karmali =

Ugandan industrialist and entrepreneur (1930–2019)

- Born: Amirali Karmali; 1 January 1930; Bukandula Village, Gomba District, Uganda
- Died: 10 July 2019 (aged 89); Kololo, Kampala, Uganda
- Occupations: Businessman, entrepreneur, & industrialist
- Years active: 1986 - 2019
- Title: Former Group & CEO; Mukwano Group of Companies
- Spouse: Mrs Karmali

Amirali Karmali (commonly known as Mukwano) (1 January 1930 – 10 July 2019), was a Ugandan businessman, entrepreneur, and industrialist. He was the chief executive officer, founder and proprietor of the Mukwano Group of Companies, a diverse conglomerate, with interests in banking, real estate, plastics, agro-processing, logistics, transportation and the manufacture of fast-moving consumer goods among others. At the time of his death, he was listed among Uganda's wealthiest individuals.

== Background ==
Amirali Karmali was born circa 1930, in Bukandula Village, in present-day Gomba District, in the Buganda Region of Uganda to Ali Mohamed Karmali. Ali Mohamed Karmali had emigrated to East Africa in 1904, worked for some time in Mbarara and later settled in Bukandula. In Bukandula, he created a lucrative business, buying cotton and coffee from local farmers, while selling them household items and farm implements. He had very friendly demeanour and nick-named "Mukwano gwa Bangi" (Friend of Many), in the Luganda language. The family moved to Fort Portal, Kabarole District, where the young Karmali acquired a second hand truck and began transporting produce to Kampala. Later Amirali relocated to Kampala, Uganda's capital city.

== Mukwano Group of Companies ==
When Idi Amin Dada, expelled Ugandan Asians in 1972, Amirali Karmali remained in Uganda. In 1986, he founded Mukwano Industries Limited, the flagship company of the Mukwano business empire. As of 2001, the conglomerate operated 46 different businesses, including expansion of the confectionery business to produce chewing gum, lollipops and chocolate. The pretax annual revenue that year was estimated at US$300 million.

== Other considerations ==
In 2011, Amirali Karmali was awarded the Order of the Nile (Class One) Medal, in recognition of his distinct performance in production and enterprise development. The award was bestowed as part of the Labor Day celebrations.

== Personal life ==
He was the father to Alykhan Karmali as well as photographer, Roshan Karmali. He died at his home in the neighborhood called Kololo, in Kampala, on the evening of Wednesday 10 July 2019, at the age of 89 years. He was laid to rest in a cemetery on Archer Road, Kololo, Kampala, on 13 July 2019.
