= National Life Finance Corporation =

- Company type: State-owned enterprise
- Industry: Financial services
- Founded: June 1, 1949; 75 years ago
- Defunct: October 1, 2008
- Fate: Dissolved and merged
- Successor: Japan Finance Corporation
- Headquarters: 1-9-3 Ōtemachi Chiyoda Tokyo, Japan
- Area served: Japan
- Products: Development loans
- Total equity: ¥369 billion (100% funded by the government) (2008)
- Owner: Government of Japan
- Parent: Ministry of Finance (Japan), Ministry of Health, Labour and Welfare (Japan)

National Life Finance Corporation (NLFC) (国民生活金融公庫 Kokumin seikatsu kin-yu kohko) was a governmental institution of Japan, which provided business loans to small enterprises that have difficulty obtaining loans from private financial institutions.

On October 1, 2008, NLFC was dissolved and merged into Japan Finance Corporation (JFC) Nihon seisaku kin-yu kohko (日本政策金融公庫).

== See also ==
- List of banks in Japan
- Japan Finance Corporation (JFC) (ja 日本語)
