= List of banks in the Comoros =

This is a list of banks in the Comoros, as updated in January 2023 by the Central Bank of the Comoros.

== List of banks ==
- Banque de Développement des Comores (BDC), state-controlled
- AFG Bank Comoros (formerly Banque pour l'Industrie et le Commerce des Comores), part of Atlantic Financial Group
- Exim Bank Comoros, part of Exim Bank Group
- Banque Féderale de Commerce (BFC)

Cooperative banks

- Mutuelles d'Epargnes et de Crédit ya Komor (MECK)
- Union des Sanduk d'Anjouan, on Anjouan
- Union des Sanduk de Mohéli, on Mohéli

International Banks

- Daixia Bank, Anjouan. Also a member of the UNGM. (www.daixiabank.com)

== See also ==
- List of banks in Africa
- List of companies based in the Comoros
