= Exim Bank Group =

Financial services conglomerate

Exim Bank Group (East Africa)
- Company type: Private conglomerate
- Industry: Banking and Finance
- Predecessor: N/A
- Founded: August 15, 1997; 28 years ago
- Headquarters: Exim Tower; 1404/05 Ghana Avenue; Dar es Salaam, Tanzania
- Key people: Juma Mwapachu; Chairman; Jaffari Matundu; Group CEO
- Products: Loans, mortgages, investments, debit cards, credit cards
- Revenue: ▲:Aftertax:TZS:16.5 billion (US$7.105 million) (2021)
- Total assets: TZS:2.4 trillion (US$1.033 billion) (July 2022)
- Number of employees: 937 (2021)
- Website: Homepage

Exim Bank Group (East Africa) (EBGEA), is a financial services conglomerate based in the African Great Lakes region. EBGEA's headquarters are in Dar es Salaam, Tanzania, with subsidiaries in Uganda, Tanzania, Comoros, Djibouti and Ethiopia.

== Overview ==
EBGEA is a large financial services conglomerate. As of 15 July 2022, the group had estimated assets exceeding TZS 2.4 trillion (US$1.033 billion).

At the end of December 2021, the group had banking operations in four countries across the East African region. The bank issues "TANAPA" Mastercards and Visa cards, acceptable regionally and internationally. At that time the group employed 937 staff members. The group's shareholders' equity at that time was TZS 204.015 billion (US$87.844 million).

== History ==
EBT was formed in 1997 by a group of Tanzanian business people. The bank is reported to have broken even within the first five months of operation. The subsidiary in the Comoros was established first, in 2007. Later, in 2011, Exim Bank opened a subsidiary in Djibouti. In 2016, the bank set foot in neighboring Uganda, by acquiring shareholding in the former Imperial Bank Uganda, converting it into Exim Bank Uganda. In December 2019 the Group established a representative office in Ethiopia, through its Djibouti subsidiary. In July 2022, Exim Bank Tanzania acquired First National Bank of Tanzania, bringing total group assets to TZS 2.4 trillion (US$1.033+ billion).

== Member companies ==
The group consists of the following subsidiaries: Exim Bank (Comoros), Exim Bank (Djibouti), Exim Bank (Uganda) and Exim Bank (Tanzania).

== See also ==
- List of banks in Tanzania
- List of banks in Uganda
- List of banks in Djibouti
- List of banks in Comoros
