= EXIM Hungary =

Hungary's export credit agency

- Type: Private limited company
- Founded: 1994
- Headquarters: Budapest, Hungary
- Key people: Dr Judit Zolnay, Chairman of the Board of Directors Zalán Kiss, Chief Executive Officer
- Website: exim.hu

EXIM Hungary is the official export credit agency of Hungary, specialized in international trade, foreign market expansion and foreign investment. It encompasses two legal entities: the Hungarian Export-Import Bank Private Limited Company (Eximbank) and the Hungarian Export Credit Insurance Private Limited Company (MEHIB). These two institutions operate within an integrated framework, providing both financing and insurance services. Their activities are governed by the relevant OECD and European Union provisions.

At the end of 2024, Eximbank's balance sheet total amounted to HUF 3.967 billion, while the bank's loan portfolio reached HUF 3.200 billion. The other member of EXIM Hungary, the MEHIB, had insurance commitments totalling HUF 835 billion.

== History ==
The predecessor of today's EXIM Hungary, the Export Guarantee Ltd., was established by the Hungarian government in 1991. From the outset, there was demand for the institution to also perform certain banking activities. Therefore, in 1994, the Hungarian National Assembly decided to split the company, which led to the establishment of the Hungarian Export-Import Bank Private Limited Company (Eximbank) and the Hungarian Export Credit Insurance Private Limited Company (MEHIB).

Since November 1996, Hungary has been a full member of the OECD Export Credits and Credit Guarantee Working Group, with Eximbank and MEHIB providing professional representation within the group. Since 1998, the insurance company has been a member with observer status of the Berne Union, an international organization of export credit insurers. Since 2001, following the establishment of the Prague Club, MEHIB has been participating as a supporting member in the work of this professional organization created for new export credit agencies operating in developing countries.

In preparation for Hungary's accession to the European Union, Eximbank adjusted its legal framework and product range to the relevant international regulations. Aid loans granted on the basis of intergovernmental agreements were a new element of the bank's activities.

Eximbank's activities in 2008–2009 were characterized by the management of liquidity shortages caused by the economic crisis, which led to a decline in business activity. Following the crisis, MEHIB also took several measures to mitigate the negative effects.

From 2012 on, the bank and the insurance company have been operating under a unified structure and brand name of EXIM Hungary. Since 2012, Eximbank's economic policy role has expanded to include job preservation, employment growth and strengthening Hungary's export capacity.

In 2014 ownership was transferred to the Ministry of Foreign Affairs and Trade. From this year onwards, the bank also participates as an investor in venture capital funds.

In 2022, the supervision of EXIM Hungary was transferred to the Ministry of Economic Development, which currently operates under the name of Ministry for National Economy.

== Business Activities ==
EXIM Hungary was established with the aim of supporting Hungarian businesses and providing them with financial services to help them succeed in foreign markets and strengthen and expand their international presence. The company's services cover the entire spectrum of export activities through banking and insurance products, such as working capital, investment or project financing, financing of foreign direct investment (FDI) projects abroad, venture capital financing through domestic and international investment funds, customer loans, discounting, export credit insurance, credit guarantees and trade guarantees.

EXIM Hungary primarily provides financing to companies through refinancing structures via Hungarian commercial banks and leasing partners. In addition to the capital provided by its owner (the Hungarian state), it also secures financing from broader financial markets, including through domestic and international bond issuances and bilateral loans. Fitch Ratings affirmed EXIM Hungary's long-term credit rating at 'BBB' and its short-term rating at 'F2' in June 2025, both in the investment grade category.

=== Foreign Risk Financing and Insurance ===
This form of financing supports the purchase of goods and/or services specified in a commercial agreement or other contractual relationship between a Hungarian exporter and a foreign buyer, typically through credit-based transactions. It also includes assistance in the execution of such transactions.

=== Domestic Financing ===
EXIM Hungary offers fixed-rate loans and leases to domestic economic actors. These loans can be used to finance working capital or investment projects.

=== Guarantee Services ===
EXIM Hungary also provides state-backed guarantees to domestic companies for loan applications and commercial transactions. Credit guarantees can be obtained from commercial banks for working capital or investment loans. In the case of commercial guarantees, EXIM assumes obligations related to domestic or export-related commercial contracts.

== Current Management of EXIM Hungary ==
Name	Position
Dr Judit Zolnay	Chairman of the Board of Directors
Zalán Kiss	Chief Executive Officer
István Széll	Deputy CEO for Business Operations
Sándor Ladányi	Deputy CEO for Finance
Róbert Bartus	Deputy CEO for Risk Management
