= Exim Bank Comoros =

Commercial bank in the Comoros

Exim Bank (Comoros)
- Type: Private
- Industry: Financial services
- Founded: 2007
- Headquarters: Moroni, Comoros
- Number of locations: 8 Branches (2024)
- Key people: Guy Rwaburindi; Chief Executive Officer
- Products: Loans, Savings, Checking, Investments, Debit Cards, Gold Loans,Remittances,MoneyGram,Ria Money Transfer,Western Union,Government Collection Account – Customs,Visa Card,Terms Loans / ODs ( Personal & SMEs),VISA - ATM / POS, Cash collections,Bank to wallet Transfer
- Website: Homepage

Exim Bank (Comoros) (EBC), also Exim Bank Comores SA (French), is a commercial bank in Moroni, the Comoros.

The bank is one of the largest commercial banks licensed by the Central Bank of the Comoros, which is the country's central bank and national banking regulator.

== Location ==
The headquarters of the bank are locate in Moroni, on the Grande Comore Island.

== Overview ==
The bank is an expanding financial services provider with eight interconnected branches, as of October 2024.

=== Exim Bank Group ===
Exim Bank (Comoros) is a subsidiary of Exim Bank (Tanzania). It is member of the Exim Bank Group (East Africa), a financial services conglomerate, with subsidiaries in Tanzania, Comoros, Djibouti and Uganda, and with assets in excess of US$3.3 billion, as of June 2016.

=== Awards ===
Exim Bank (Comoros) has won the island nation’s 2024 Bank of the Year Award by The Banker for the fourth consecutive year, recognised for its strong financial performance and dedicated efforts to expand financial inclusion for micro, small and medium-sized enterprises.

=== Branches ===
As of October 2017, the bank maintains branches at the following locations: (1) Main Branch, at Moroni, Grande Comore Island. (2) Mutsamudu, at Mutsamudu, Anjouan Island, (3) Moheli Branch, at Fomboni, Moheli Island (4) Domoni Branch, at Domoni, Anjouan Island. (5) Mitsamiouli Branch, at Mitsamiouli, Grand Comore Island, (6) Foumbouni, at Foumbouni, Grand Comore Island, (7) Gold Loan Center, at Moroni, Grand Comore Island and (8) Volo-Volo, at Moroni, Grand Comore Island.

== See also ==
- Exim Bank (Tanzania)
- Exim Bank (Uganda)
- Exim Bank (Djibouti)
- List of banks in the Comoros
