= Tadashi Maeda (banker) =

Japanese banker

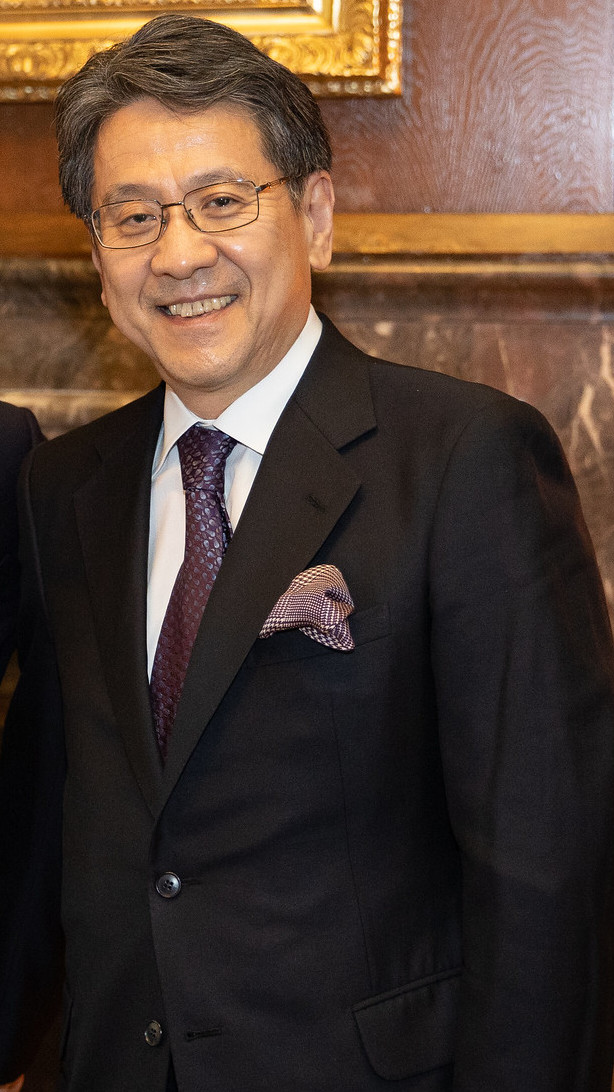

Tadashi Maeda (born December 1957) is governor of the Japan Bank for International Cooperation. He was previously senior managing director He is a member of the council of the International Institute for Strategic Studies.

On 10 April 2024, Maeda was among the guests invited to the state dinner hosted by U.S. President Joe Biden in honor of Prime Minister Fumio Kishida at the White House.
