= Japan Finance Corporation =

Japanese financial services company

- Native name: 日本政策金融公庫
- Company type: State owned KK
- Founded: 1 October 2008; 17 years ago
- Headquarters: Tokyo, Japan
- Area served: Worldwide
- Key people: Koichi Hosokawa (Governor and CEO)
- Revenue: ¥ 788.3 Billion (2014)
- Net income: ¥ -35.9 Billion (2014)
- Total assets: ¥24,653 Billion (2014)
- Total equity: ¥4,507 Billion (2014)
- Number of employees: 7,364 (2014)
- Website: www.jfc.go.jp

Japan Finance Corporation (株式会社日本政策金融公庫, Kabushiki gaisha Nihon Seisaku Kin'yū Kōko; JFC) is a public corporation that provides financial services in Japan and internationally. Its headquarters are located in Tokyo, Japan.

== Overview ==
JFC is a policy based financial institution whose co-function is the provision of business loans to SMEs and business start-ups; and educational loans to individuals for school entrance fees and related expenses. All these are with the aim of complement financial activities carried out by privately owned financial institutions as well as improve the living standards of the Japanese people.

The company has 152 branch offices in Japan, 2 representative offices overseas, and a workforce of 7,364 employees.

== History ==
Japan Finance Corporation was founded on 1 October 2008 with the passing of the Japan Finance Corporation Act. This Act led to the merger of four policy-based financing institutions i.e.:

- The National Life Finance Corporation (NLFC)
- The Agriculture, Forestry and Fisheries Finance Corporation (AFC)
- The Japan Finance Corporation for Small and Medium Enterprise (JASME) and
- The International Financial Operations of the Japan Bank for International Cooperation (JBIC).

In April 2012, the Japan Bank for International Cooperation Act was passed. This led to the separation of the Japan Bank for International Cooperation (JBIC) from JFC. JBIC has since operated as an independent entity.

== Operations ==
JFC has divided its operations in three units:

=== Micro Business and Individual Unit ===
This unit acts (Micro Unit) as a community based financial institution and provides loans to small businesses, business start-ups and educational loans to individuals. As of March 2014 the Micro Unit had made loans to 0.95 million businesses. It is estimated that 77,000 jobs were created and 110,000 educational loans are issued annually as a result of the Micro Unit.

=== Agriculture, Forestry, Fisheries and Food Business Unit ===
This unit (AFFF Unit) contributes to the development of domestic agriculture, forestry, the fishery industry and improved quality of food. This is by providing access to finance for individuals and businesses operating in these industries.

=== Small and Medium Enterprise Unit ===
Recognizing that SMEs play a key economic role in the Japanese economy, this unit assists in the development and growth of SMEs through the provision of financial support in the form of loans and credit insurance.

== Ownership ==
JFC is wholly owned by the Japanese government.

== Governance ==
JFC is governed by a five-person board of directors with Koichi Hosokawa as the Governor and Chief Executive.
