= Mukwano Group =

Ugandan conglomerate

- Company type: Private Conglomerate
- Industry: Agriculture, Manufacturing, Transportation, Food Processing
- Founded: 1986
- Headquarters: Kampala, Uganda
- Key people: Tony Gadhoke; Chief Executive Officer
- Products: Edible oil, Margarine, Plastics, Office buildings, Houses, Plastics
- Number of employees: 6,000 + (2009)
- Website: Homepage

The Mukwano Group of Companies, commonly known as the Mukwano Group, is a conglomerate based in Uganda, with operations in other East African countries.

== Overview ==
The group was established in 1986, although it did not start operations until 1989. As of October 2016, the group is involved in six main areas of business: (a) manufacturing (b) real estate investments (c) bulk storage & shipment (d) cargo clearing & forwarding (e) agriculture and (f) financial services. Mukwano Group is one of the most active investment groups in Uganda. The group won the coveted Annual Presidential Award of Best Exporter of the Year for 2004. In 2009, its beverages division attained ISO Certification.

== Subsidiary companies ==
The subsidiary companies of the Mukwano Group include but are not limited to the following:

- AK Transporters Uganda Limited; a fully licensed and equipped logistics and transport company with over 200 light, medium and heavy transport trucks.
- Gulf Stream Investments Limited; a bulk liquid-storage terminal within the port area of Mombasa, Kenya. The terminal can store close to 26,000 metric tonnes of vegetable oils, oil derivatives and related chemicals in dedicated tanks.
- Exim Bank (Uganda); a retail commercial bank jointly owned with Exim Bank (Tanzania).
- Lira Maize Factory Limited; located in Lira, Lira District, Northern Uganda.
- Lira Oil Mill Limited; which produces in excess of 25,000 tons of oil annually, from sunflower and cottonseed, since 2007.
- Mukwano Agro Project Limited; which consists of over 17,000 acres (27 mi^{2}) under cultivation in Masindi District. Crops include maize, soybeans, sunflower, and simsim. Contracts with over 45,000 out-growers whose farm acreage is in the neighborhood of 200,000 acres (310 mi^{2}).
- Mukwano AK Plastics; which manufactures household and industrial plastic products.
- Mukwano Dar es Salaam Factory; located in Dar es Salaam, Tanzania, the factory has manufactured edible oil and soap since 2004.
- Mukwano Industries Limited, a manufacturer of edible oil, soaps, cleaning products, sanitary products, household and industrial plastic products, bottled water and energy drinks.
- Mukwano Sugar Factory; a licensed sugar manufacturer, located in Masindi District, with capacity to process 2,500 metric tonnes of raw sugarcane daily (912,000 tonnes annually).
- Nationwide Properties Limited; a real-estate development company that builds commercial and residential properties. Nationwide is a joint venture between the Mukwano Group and Property Services Limited, a real estate management firm in Uganda.
- Riley Packaging Limited; the largest producer of packaging materials in East Africa, a joint venture between Mukwano Group and Raps Limited, another Ugandan company. The factory, estimated at US$13 million, is located in Mukono on the Kampala-Jinja Highway.

== Products ==
The products of the Group include:

Oil

- Sunseed Sunflower oil
- Soyseed soyabean oil
- Mukwano Olive oil
- Cornseed Corn oil
- Roki vegetable oil
- Mukwano Vegetable oil

Laundry bar soap

- Mukwano Star White soap
- Chapa Nyota soap - Blue and Brown
- Chapa Mukwano soap - White and Blue
- Mukwano Bright soap - Regular and Aloe Vera
- Mama soap

Detergent

- Nomi White detergent powder
- Nomi IDP - Industrial detergent powder
- Nomi bleach - Regular and Color
- Supa dishwashing liquid
- Supa dishwashing paste
- Supa Scouring Powder
- Supa Toilet Cleaner

Drinking bottled water

- Aqua Sipi drinking water

Plastics

- More than 450 plastic and PET products

== See also ==
- Kampala Capital City Authority
- Kampala Central Division
- List of banks in Uganda
- List of conglomerates in Uganda
- List of sugar manufacturers in Uganda
