= First National Bank of Tanzania =

Defunct commercial bank in Tanzania

First National Bank Tanzania
- Type: Subsidiary
- Industry: Financial services
- Founded: 2011; 15 years ago
- Defunct: 2022; 4 years ago
- Fate: Acquired by Exim Bank
- Headquarters: Dar-es-Salaam, Tanzania
- Key people: Richard Hudson (chief executive officer)
- Products: Loans, transaction accounts, savings, investments, debit cards
- Owner: Before acquisition: FirstRand Group

First National Bank Tanzania (FNBT), was a commercial bank in Tanzania. It is one of the commercial banks licensed by the Bank of Tanzania, the national banking regulator. It was a subsidiary of major South African financial institution FirstRand.

The bank ceased operations in 2022, after being acquired by Exim Bank.

== History ==
The bank commenced operations in Tanzania, in July 2011, following the issuance of a commercial banking licence by the Bank of Tanzania, the country's central bank and national banking regulator. Its headquarters and main branch are located in Dar es Salaam, the national capital and largest city in the country.

== Ownership ==
As of May 2012, FNBT stock was 100% owned by the FirstRand Group, a large financial services provider, based in South Africa, with subsidiaries in about 10 sub-Saharan countries, as well as in Australia and India. The stock of the group is listed on the Johannesburg Securities Exchange (JSE), where it trades under the symbol: FSR.

In July 2022, First National Bank of Tanzania was acquired by Exim Bank (Tanzania), for an undisclosed financial consideration. According to media reports, FNBT then ceased operations.

== Branch network ==
As of May 2012, First National Bank of Tanzania maintained branches at the following locations:

1. Main Branch – Dar es Salaam (Operational)
2. Peninsula Branch – Dar es Salaam (Operational)
3. Industrial Branch – Dar es Salaam (Operational)
4. Kariakoo Branch – Dar es Salaam (Operational)
5. Sinza Branch – Dar es Salaam (Operational)
6. Mbezi Beach Branch – Dar es Salaam (Operational)
7. Kimweri Branch – Dar es Salaam (Operational)
8. Arusha Branch – Arusha (Operational)
9. Mwanza Branch – Mwanza (Operational)
10. Mbeya Branch – Mbeya (Coming soon)
11. Dodoma Branch – Dodoma (Coming soon)

== See also ==
- List of banks in Tanzania
- FirstRand
- First National Bank (South Africa)
- Economy of Tanzania
