= Exim Bank Djibouti =

Commercial bank in Djibout

Exim Bank (Djibouti) S. A
- Company type: Private
- Industry: Financial services
- Founded: March 1, 2011; 15 years ago
- Headquarters: Djibouti City, Djibouti
- Key people: Jacky Kayiteshonga; Chief Executive Officer
- Products: Loans, Savings, Checking, Investments, Debit Cards, Credit Cards
- Revenue: ▲ Aftertax:US$2 million DJF:368,769,313 (2016)
- Total assets: US$102 million (DJF:18.2 billion) (2016)
- Number of employees: 70+ (2020)
- Website: Homepage

Exim Bank (Djibouti) (EBD), also Exim Bank Djibouti SA or Exim Bank of Djibouti, is a commercial bank in Djibouti. The bank is one of the commercial banks licensed by the Central Bank of Djibouti, which is the country's central bank and national banking regulator.

== Overview ==
EBD is a 100 percent subsidiary of Exim Bank (Tanzania), and is a member of the Exim Bank Group (East Africa), a financial services conglomerate, with subsidiaries in Comoros, Djibouti, Tanzania and Uganda, whose total assets were in excess of US$3.3 billion, as of June 2016. The Djibouti subsidiary, was the second to be established, following the one in the Comoros, which was set up in 2007. In 2016, the conglomerate set foot in Uganda, by establishing Exim Bank Uganda.

== History ==
Exim Bank (Djibouti) was formed in Djibouti in October 2010 and is registered as a public shareholding company in accordance with Licensing and Supervision of Banking Business Proclamation N° Loi 119/AN/11/6ème L. and Company Commercial act of Djibouti in Code de Commerce. The registered address of the bank is Avenue Mohamed Farar Dirir. The Bank's principal activity is commercial banking. The Bank's employees as of December 2016 were 42. The bank received its banking license in March 2011.

== Ownership ==
The stock of Exim Bank (Djibouti) is owned by Exim Bank Tanzania Limited. The current shareholding in the bank is summarized in the table below:

Exim Bank Djibouti Stock Ownership
Rank	Name of Owner	Percentage Ownership
1	Exim Bank (Tanzania)	100.0
	TOTAL	100.0

== Branch Network ==
As of December 2016, EBD maintains branches at the following locations: (1) Main Branch, at Avenue Mohamed Farar Dirir, Djibouti City, and (2) Free Zone Branch, at Free Zone, Djibouti City

== See also ==
- Exim Bank (Comoros)
- Exim Bank (Uganda)
- List of banks in Djibouti
