= Exim Bank Team China =

Exim Bank Team China is a title in auto racing for teams sponsored by Exim Bank of China. It may refer to:

- Selleslagh Racing Team, who used the title in 2011
- Mühlner Motorsport, who use the title in 2012
