= Cutzamala River =

Location
- Country: Mexico
- States: Michoacán, Guerrero

Physical characteristics
- Mouth
  - location: Balsas River

The Cutzamala River is a river of Mexico. It originates in the Trans-Mexican Volcanic Belt of Central Mexico in the state of Michoacán. Dams on the upper portion of river provide water to Mexico City, via an aqueduct over the mountains known as the Cutzamala System.

The lower Cutzamala forms part of the border between Michoacán and Guerrero states. It empties into the Balsas River near Ciudad Altamirano, Guerrero.

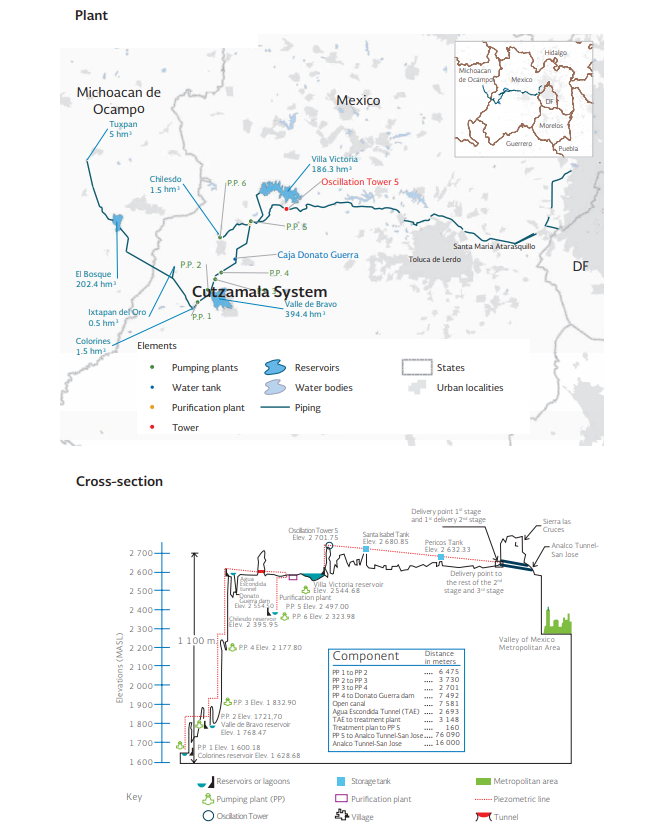
The Cutzamala System, which transports water from the upper Cutzamala River to Mexico City.

== See also ==
- List of rivers of Mexico
