= Foreign aid institutions of Japan =

Japan has been establishing its foreign aid contributors since the 1990s. The three government institutions involved in disbursing this are: the Japan International Cooperation Agency (JICA), and the Japanese Bank of International Cooperation (JBIC). This is now the nodal agency for all Japanese concessional loans, and replaced Japan Export-Import Bank (JEXIM) and the Overseas Economic Cooperation Fund (OECF) in 1999.

While earlier attempts were criticised, more recently a concerted effort has since been made to increase spending and target specific areas of need. In the 2000s, the goals of national security were included for the first time.

== JICA ==
Since joining the Colombo Plan in 1954, Japan has been providing financial and technical assistance to developing countries through ODA, aiming to contribute more proactively to the peace, Stability and prosperity of the international community. JICA is in charge of administering all ODA such as technical cooperation, Finance and Investment Cooperation and Grants in an integrated manner, except for contributions to international organisations. JICA, the world's largest bilateral aid agency, works in over 150 countries and regions and has some 90 overseas offices. Founded in October in 2003 Japan International Cooperation Agency facilitates official development assistance for Japanese government. Among its main goals are economic growth assistance and international cooperation promotion. JICA continued its predecessor's purpose of providing ODA to developing counties.

=== JICA's Initiatives ===
- Mission: JICA, in accordance with the Development Cooperation Charter, will work on human security and quality growth.
- Vision: Leading the world with trust JICA, with its partners, will take the lead in forging bonds of trust across the world, aspiring for a free, peaceful and prosperous world where people can hope for a better future and explore their diverse potentials.

=== JICA's Cooperation with Asia ===
Southeast Asia

- Support for Economic Growth：JICA has provided assistances from the project level to the policy level, such as the development of hard infrastructure and soft infrastructure and human resources development. JICA also provides assistance for establishing the institutions needed to promote public-private partnerships (PPP) projects, and strengthen partnerships with private-sector funds and corporate activities, including those of small to medium-sized enterprises to support regional development.
- Promotion of Inclusive Development: JICA is providing assistance for income generation, basic social services in the field of education and health, regional development and so on. Other activities include assistance for minority ethnic groups in Myanmar and strengthening the capacities of government institutions for the consolidation of peace in the Mindanao region of the Philippines.
- Initiatives for Emerging Issues and Regional Issues:JICA provides assistance for strengthening disaster risk management, maritime security, cyber-security, the environment and climate change.

South Asia

- Promotion of Quality Growth: After Sub-Saharan Africa, the South Asia region has the second highest number of people living in poverty so poverty reduction is a pressing issue. JICA promotes the development of infrastructure, the improvement of political measures and systems, and cooperation with Japanese companies with the aim of providing a significant boost to their development. JICA also promotes the provision of support for people living in poverty and other vulnerable groups in terms of education, agriculture, rural development, and other such areas.
- Realization of Peace and a Safe Society: In addition to Afghanistan and Pakistan, JICA promotes the provision of support for Sri Lanka, which is transitioning from the reconstruction stage to the development stage following the internal conflict that ended in 2009, and Nepal, which is in the process of nation building.

Furthering Cooperation within Central Asia

- JICA promotes cooperation within Central Asia and the Caucasus via developing transportation infrastructure in light of government policy that includes the “Central Asia plus Japan” dialogue, and it supports the reduction of poverty through private sector development and rural development in the respective countries.

=== JICA's Partnership ===
Partnerships in Japan: JICA is coordinating and facilitating partnerships with stakeholders in Japan through a wide range of support schemes. For example, there are financing schemes for private sector investment, preparatory surveys for infrastructure and BOP projects, and capacity development projects run by NGOs, local government entities and universities. JICA also promotes science and technology research partnerships between research institutions in developing countries and in Japan. Donor Coordination for Development Cooperation: JICA has established partnerships with various development partners, such as:

- The United Nations Development Programme (UNDP)United Nations Development Programme
- The Office of the United Nations High Commissioner for Refugees (UNHCR) United Nations High Commissioner for Refugees
- The World Bank (WB) World Bank
- The Asian Development Bank (ADB) Asian Development Bank

National governments, including in Europe and the United States. JICA also cooperates at a higher level through enhanced collaboration with nonconventional providers, including the Bill & Melinda Gates Foundation and the Aga Khan Foundation, as well as the Arab Coordination Group. Partnerships enable not only to improve the quality of international initiatives but also to raise the profile of Japan's ODA-related experience, approaches and principles. Moreover, collaboration can be a solution to the support of large-scale development projects in cases where a single organization cannot meet the requirements. Also, JICA has enhanced relationships with think tanks and the United Nations for the conducting of joint research and the publishing of reports on the results of such research.

== The 1970s and 1980s ==
In the decades following World War II, Japan's official aid agency (the Overseas Economic Cooperation Fund) had significant overlap with the business of the Japan Export-Import Bank (JEXIM) and was initially part of JEXIM.

Historically, Japan's foreign aid policies were widely criticized by many countries within the Organization for Economic Co-operation and Development (OECD) Development Assistance Committee (DAC). While there has been a general increase in spending, much of the criticism is in regards to the quality of the aid. Much of the money went to corrupt government officials in Asia and projects that caused serious damage to the environment.

It is important to understand the structure of Japan's government and how that affects foreign aid. The largest problem is that there is no political center for foreign aid policies. Alan Rix, a political analyst who specializes in Japan, notes “due largely to historical factors and entrenched bureaucratic interests, foreign aid is seriously underrepresented in the Japanese political system”. Reports from the OECD from the 1980s show a dismal trend for Japanese foreign aid. Of the 18 DAC members, Japan ranked 12th overall. Japan ranked 12th in money spent per capita, 18th in share of grants, and ranked 14th in technical cooperation.

In the 1980s, the government introduced the New Aid Plan which sought to integrate aid with trade and investment. The plan's rationale was that through providing aid that would increase industrial development in host countries, particularly in southeast Asia, the state could help develop overseas markets for the expansion of Japanese business. Until the middle of the decade, much of Japanese foreign aid focused on supporting the extraction of resources like timber and food, or industrial commodities like rubber and minerals from southeast Asia, as well as infrastructure like local transportation and port facilities.

Also during the 1980s, Japanese contractors for foreign development assistance projects became implicated in a major corruption issues that embarrassed the country's approach to providing aid.

Japanese aid was heavily loan-based, rather than grant-based.

== The 1990s ==
In the 1990s, Japan's position switched. It revised its foreign aid position and released an Official Development Assistance (ODA) Charter in 1992. During the 1990s Japan became the world's top aid donor. The goals of the charter were “human security, poverty alleviation, health, and women's welfare”.

Academic William W. Grimes writes that "[u]ntil well into the 1990s, Japanese aid was well known for its mercantile nature. Not only was the aid heavily tied to Japanese contractors and projects, but the projects were also designed to support the needs of the Japanese economy and firms."

== The 2000s ==
While Japan isn't the top donor in the world, it is still at number four overall. It updated the charter in 2003 and again in 2015. While previous governments kept military and defense-related activities out of aid services, new geopolitical concerns have altered the function of aid. As China continues to rise, it threatens Japan's hegemony in the region. Escalating tensions in the South China Sea have caused Japan to switch its foreign aid packages. It provided surveillance ships to the Vietnamese and the Filipino coast guards. Japan has also started promoting cybersecurity and maritime security in the region. Japan's Prime Minister Shinzō Abe called these approaches ‘pro-active pacifism’. While Japan has redefined its goals, it still has a commitment to traditional aid philosophies. It spends large amounts of financial and human capital to confront humanitarian issues in the developing world.
