= Japan Bank for International Cooperation =

Japanese public financial institution

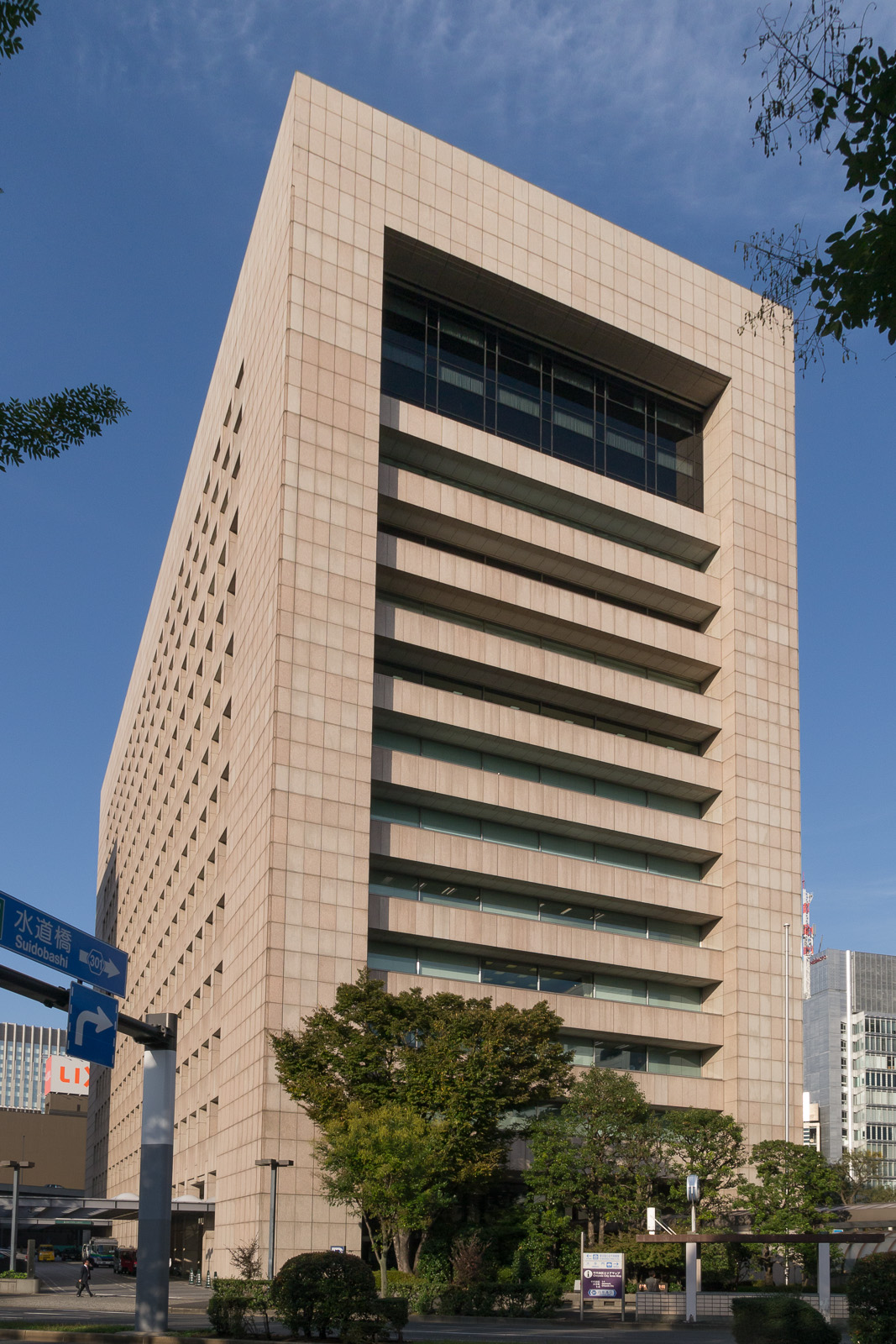
- Main office in Ōtemachi district in Chiyoda, Tokyo
- Native name: 国際協力銀行
- Type: State owned
- Headquarters: Tokyo, Japan
- Key people: Tadashi Maeda (President & CEO)
- Website: https://www.jbic.go.jp/en/

The Japan Bank for International Cooperation (国際協力銀行, Kokusai Kyōryoku Ginkō), JBIC, is a Japanese public financial institution and export credit agency that was created on October 1, 1999, through the merger of the Japan Export-Import Bank (JEXIM) and the Overseas Economic Cooperation Fund (OECF).

JBIC became the international wing of the Japan Finance Corporation (JFC) (日本政策金融公庫, Nihon seisaku kin-yu kohko) (administered by the Ministry of Finance) established on October 1, 2008. It became independent again from JFC on April 1, 2012. The bank is wholly owned by the Japanese government, and its budget and operations are regulated by the JBIC law. It is headquartered in Tokyo and operates in 18 countries with 21 offices. The main purpose of the institution is to promote economic cooperation between Japan and overseas countries by providing resources to foreign investments and by fostering international commerce. It has a major role in promoting Japanese exports and imports, and the country's activities overseas. The bank's presence can be seen both in developed and developing countries. It tries to contribute to the stability of the international financial order and follows a policy of not competing with ordinary financial institutions. The bank was one of the instruments of Japan's official development assistance (ODA), which contributes to the execution of the country's foreign policy. JBIC claims to aim at sustainable development and to be concerned about social and environmental issues, and requires environmental impact assessment studies to provide funding to any project. According to the OECD, Japan's total official development assistance (ODA) (USD 17.5 billion, grant-equivalent methodology, preliminary data) increased in 2022 due to an increase in its bilateral lending, which includes support to Ukraine. ODA represented 0.39% of gross national income (GNI). Nonetheless, it was the biggest known financier of coal projects among public institutions worldwide in 2016 and continued to finance coal up to at least 2019.

== Inauguration of the new JBIC ==
Following the passage of the Japan Finance Corporation Law on May 18, 2007, during the 166th Ordinary Session of the Diet, the international financial operations (IFOs) of Japan Bank for International Cooperation (JBIC) were merged with National Life Finance Corporation (NLFC), Agriculture, Forestry and Fisheries Finance Corporation (AFC), and Japan Finance Corporation for Small and Medium Enterprise (JASME) on October 1, 2008, to become a new policy-based financing institution, tentatively called Japan Finance Corporation (JFC).

To maintain the international trust and confidence enjoyed by previous JBIC, the international finance sector of JFC continued to use the name "Japan Bank for International Cooperation".

=== Overview of the new JBIC from 2008 to 2012 ===
Of the two types of operations conducted by the former JBIC, new JBIC took over IFOs in its international finance sector.

JBIC was the international wing of Japan Finance Corporation (JFC) from October 1, 2008 to April 1, 2012. "The predecessor of JBIC is the International Financial Operations of former JBIC. JFC once took over those IFOs in its international wing.

==== Mission ====
The new JBIC constituted the international finance sector of Japan Finance Corporation (JFC), a policy-based financing institution.

The new JBIC performs the following three functions to contribute to sound development of the international economy, including Japan:

1. Promote overseas development of strategically important natural resources
2. Support Japanese industry efforts to develop international business operations
3. Respond to financial disorder in the international economy

In addition to the above functions, the new JBIC will take over, on a separate account, financial operations for effective realignment of the United States military forces stationed in Japan pursuant to the relevant special legislation.

==== Key operational principles ====
The new JBIC will conduct business operations based on the following principles:

- Well-focused policy-based financing: As a policy-based financing institution, the new JBIC shall conduct speedy and well-focused operations based on policy needs in response to economic and financial situations in Japan and abroad.
- Complementing private-sector financial institutions: To effectively perform the functions required for policy-based financing, the new JBIC shall take account of situations where private sector financial institutions are placed in their international finance activities and supplement them.
- Sufficient revenues to cover expenditures: Pursuant to the Japan Finance Corporation Law, the new JBIC shall make efforts to maintain the financial soundness of its international finance operations.
- Maintaining and improving international trust and confidence to conduct adequate international finance operations and effective funding operations, the new JBIC shall maintain and improve the international trust and confidence enjoyed by JBIC.
- Conducting business operations by drawing on its expertise and initiatives: The new JBIC shall conduct operations by drawing on its own expertise and initiatives on international finance.

== Operation ==
Former JBIC had mainly two ways of performing its loans: international financial operations (IFOs) and overseas economic operations (ODA). These operations were independent of each other and were clearly separated in the bank's financial statements.

The IFO operations include loans and equity participation in overseas projects of Japanese corporations, therefore contributing to Japanese activities overseas. These operations are aimed at both developed and developing countries. As of March 31, 2006, the IFO operations accounted for ¥985.5 billion.

The ODA operations were aimed mainly at developing countries, especially those in Asia, which accounted for 15.8% of the bank's operations in 2004 fiscal year. These operations provide long-term and low-interest loans to important projects that develop social structure and infrastructure of developing countries. The JBIC's financial assistance represented 40 percent of Japan's official development assistance. As of March 31, 2006, the ODA operations accounted for ¥770 billion. These ODA operations were merged with Japan International Cooperation Agency in 2008.

As of March 2005, the country which had access to the most loans was Indonesia, followed by China and the Philippines. Brazil was the most benefited from South American countries, holding the sixth place in the bank's investments.
