= Buyer's credit =

Term credit available to a buy from overseas lenders

Buyer credit is a term credit available to an importer (buyer) from overseas lenders such as banks and other financial institution for goods they are importing. In simple words it is the credit that is given by a bank to a foreign buyer where funds are paid directly to the buyer through a lending bank. The overseas banks usually lend the importer (buyer) based on the letter of comfort (a bank guarantee) issued by the importer's bank. For this service the importer's bank or buyer's credit consultant charges a fee called an arrangement fee.

Buyer's credit helps local importers gain access to cheaper foreign funds that may be closer to LIBOR rates as against local sources of funding which are more costly.

The duration of buyer's credit may vary from country to country, as per the local regulations. For example, in India, buyer's credit can be availed for one year in case the import is for tradeable goods and for three years if the import is for capital goods.

== Benefits to importer ==
Buyer's credit has several advantages for the importer. The exporter gets paid on due date; whereas importer gets extended date for making an import payment as per the cash flows. The importer can deal with exporter on sight basis, negotiate a better discount and use the buyers credit route to avail financing. The funding currency can be depending on the choice of the customer and availability of LIBOR rates in the exchange market. The importer can use this financing for any form of payment mode, such as: open account, collections, or LCs.

== Steps involved ==
1. The importers and exporters sign a contractual agreement for the trading of capital/ non-capital goods under LC (Letter of credit)/ DA/DP.
2. The Exporter ships the goods and submit shipping documents to the supplier's bank as per the contractual agreement.
3. The importer/ buyer approaches the consultant to extend a Buyer's Credit before the due date.
4. The consultants contact overseas lenders like banks or other financial institutions or foreign branches of domestic banks and ask to provide the best possible buyer's credit quotes on behalf of the importer.
5. The consultant quotes the same to the importer and if the importer agrees on the rate of interest on buyers credit, the overseas lender issue a letter of offer in prescribed format which has to be accepted by the buyer.
6. Importer's bank issue SBLC (Standby Letter of Credit) under SWIFT Message format MT760.
7. Importer's bank issue MT799 in the given format (like the LOU format used earlier).
8. Overseas bank/ lender funds the Importer's bank Nostro account for the required amount
9. Importer's bank to make import bill payment by utilizing the amount credited (if the borrowing currency is different from the currency of Imports then a cross-currency contract is utilized to affect the import payment)
10. Importer's bank shall recover the required amount from the importer on the due date and remit the same to the overseas bank.

== Cost involved ==
Interest cost is charged by overseas bank as a financing cost.

== Risk involved ==
Buyer's credit is associated with currency risk.

== Indian regulatory framework ==
Banks can provide buyer’s credit up to US$20 million (US$ 2 crore) per import transactions for a maximum maturity period of one year from date of shipment. In case of import of capital goods, banks can approve buyer’s credits up to $20 million per transaction with a maturity period of up to three years. No rollover beyond that period is permitted.

As per RBI directives dated 11.07.13, at the time of availment of trade credit, the period of trade credit should be linked to the operating cycle and trade transaction. AD banks need to ensure that these instructions are strictly complied with.

RBI has issued directions under Sec 10(4) and Sec 11(1) of the Foreign Exchange Management Act, 1999, stating that authorized dealers may approve proposals received (in Form ECB) for short-term credit for financing—by way of either suppliers' credit or buyers' credit—of import of goods into India, based on uniform criteria. Credit is to be extended for a period of less than three years; amount of credit should not exceed $20 million, per import transaction; the `all-in-cost' per annum, payable for the credit is not to exceed 6 months LIBOR + 350 basis points for credit up to one year, and LIBOR + 125 basis points for credits for periods beyond one year but less than three years, for the currency of credit.

All applications for short-term credit exceeding $20 million for any import transaction are to be forwarded to the Chief General Manager, Exchange Control Department, Reserve Bank of India, Central Office, External Commercial Borrowing (ECB) Division, Mumbai. Each credit has to be given `a unique identification number' by authorised dealers and the number so allotted should be quoted in all references. The International Banking Division of the authorised dealer is required to furnish the details of approvals granted by all its branches, during the month, in Form ECB-ST to the RBI, so as to reach not later than 5th of the following month. (Circular AP (DIR Series) No 24 dated September 27, 2002.

As per RBI Master circular on External Commercial Borrowing and Trade Finance 1 July 2011, the all-in cost ceiling for interest is now six month L + 200 bps(bps is Basis Points . A unit that is equal to 1/100th of 1%) for buyer's credit arrange for tenure up to three years. All cost ceiling includes arranger fee, upfront fee, management fee, handling and processing charges, out-of-pocket and legal expenses, if any.

The above ceiling got revised on 15/11/2011 to 6 Month Libor + 350 bps and got further extended on 30/03/2012 till 30/09/2012. From 01-10-2012 Maximum cap of 6 Month Libor + 350 bsp has been extended till further review.

== See also ==
- Trade credit
- Trade credit insurance
- External commercial borrowing
