= Exim Bank (Tanzania) =

Commercial bank in Tanzania

- Company type: Private
- Industry: Financial services
- Founded: 1997; 29 years ago
- Headquarters: Exim Tower, Plot Number 1404, Block Number 05, Ghana Avenue, Dar es Salaam, Tanzania
- Key people: Ambassador Juma Mwapachu; Chairman; Jaffari Matundu; Chief Executive Officer; Shani Kinswaga; Chief Financial Officer
- Products: Loans, Savings, Checking, Investments, Debit Cards, Credit Cards, Mortgages
- Revenue: ▲ Aftertax:TSh 16.481 billion (US$7.096 million) (2021)
- Total assets: TSh 1.372 trillion (US$590.574 million) (2021)
- Website: Company website

Exim Bank (Tanzania) (EBT), is a commercial bank in Tanzania, the second-largest economy in the East African Community. The bank is licensed by the Bank of Tanzania, which is the country's central bank and national banking regulator.

== Overview ==
EBT is a large banking institution, providing commercial banking services to individuals, small-to-medium-sized businesses (SMEs), and large corporate clients. As of December 2021, according to its annual report, published on the bank's website, the bank's total assets were valued at TSh 1.372 trillion (US$590.3 million), assuming an exchange rate of 2,322/45 per US dollar, with shareholders' equity of TSh 170.843 billion (US$73.6 million).

The Exim Bank Group was the fifth largest commercial bank group in the country, by assets, as of April 2014. By June 2016, the bank's total assets had grown to TSh 1.5 trillion (approx. US$700.8 million). Following the acquisition of the business and assets of United Bank Tanzania Limited, in November 2019, Exim Bank (Tanzania), increased its assets to US$732.4 million.

== History ==
EBT was formed in 1997 by a group of Tanzanian business people, following the liberalization of the Tanzanian economy. It reportedly broke even within the first five months of operation. As of November 2019, EBT maintained wholly owned banking subsidiaries in the Comoros, Djibouti and Uganda. It is the first indigenous Tanzanian bank to own subsidiaries outside the country, as at March 2016. In April 2010, the bank was authorized by the Bank of Tanzania to establish subsidiaries in Djibouti and Zambia, thus setting up the Exim Bank (East Africa) Group, a regional banking financial services organization. In March 2016, EBT acquired 58.6% of Imperial Bank (Uganda) Limited and changed its name to Exim Bank (Uganda) Limited. In November 2019, Exim Bank Tanzania acquired the businesses and assets of United Bank Tanzania Limited, a subsidiary of the Pakistan bank, United Bank Limited. In July 2022, Exim Bank Tanzania acquired First National Bank of Tanzania, bringing total group assets to TSh 2.4 trillion (US$1.033+ billion).

== Exim Bank Group (East Africa) ==
Exim Bank Tanzania, is the largest subsidiary of the Exim Bank Group (East Africa), a large financial services conglomerate, that maintains its headquarters in Dar es Salaam, Tanzania's largest city. Members of the banking group include:

1. Exim Bank (Tanzania) - Dar-es-Salaam, Tanzania
2. Exim Bank (Comoros) - Moroni, Comoros
3. Exim Bank (Djibouti) - Djibouti City, Djibouti.
4. Exim Bank (Uganda) - Kampala, Uganda.

== Ownership ==
The stock of Exim Bank (Tanzania) is owned by private individuals and corporate entities. The current shareholding in the bank is summarized in the table below:

Exim Bank Tanzania Stock Ownership
Rank	Name of Owner	Percentage Ownership
1	Yogesh Manek	20.0
2	Hanif Jaffer	20.0
3	Shaffin Jamal	20.0
4	Azim Kassam	20.0
5	Azim Virjee	20.0
	TOTAL	100.0

== Branch network ==
As of October 2017, EBT maintains 33 branches at the following locations inside Tanzania:

1. Clock Tower Branch - Samora Avenue, Dar es Salaam
2. Exim Tower Branch - Exim Tower, Dar es Salaam
3. Hill Park Branch - Mlimani City, Dar es Salaam
4. Samora Avenue Branch - 9 Samora Avenue, Dar-es-Salaam
5. Kariakoo Branch - Morogoro Road, Dar es Salaam
6. Mkwepu Branch - Mkwepu Street, Dar es Salaam
7. Namanga Branch - Namanga, Dar es Salaam
8. Nyerere Road Branch - Nyerere Road, Dar es Salaam
9. Temeke Branch - Chang'ombe, Dar es Salaam
10. Mwanza Branch - Kenyatta Road, Mwanza
11. Arusha Branch - Goliondoi Road, Arusha
12. Mount Meru Branch - Uhuru Road, Arusha
13. Moshi Branch - Boma Road, Moshi
14. Tanga Branch - Independence Avenue, Tanga
15. Zanzibar Branch - Mlandege Street, Zanzibar
16. Morogoro Branch - Lumumba Road, Morogoro
17. Mbeya Branch - Industrial Area, Mbeya
18. Mtwara Branch - Tanu Road, Mtwara
19. Iringa Branch - Iringa
20. Shinyanga Branch - Shinyanga
21. Tabora Branch - Tabora
22. Karatu Branch - Karatu
23. Kigoma Branch - Kigoma
24. Mwanakwerekwe Branch- Zanzibar
25. Lumumba Branch - Ushirika Towers, Lumumba Street, Dar es Salaam
26. Udom Branch - UDOM College of Informatics, Dodoma

== Governance ==
The chairman of the board is Ambassador Juma Mwapachu, a non-executive director. The chief executive officer is Jaffari Matundu, who is a non-shareholder.

== See also ==
- List of banks in Tanzania
- Economy of Tanzania
- Exim Bank (Djibouti)
