= Exim Bank (Uganda) =

Bank in Uganda

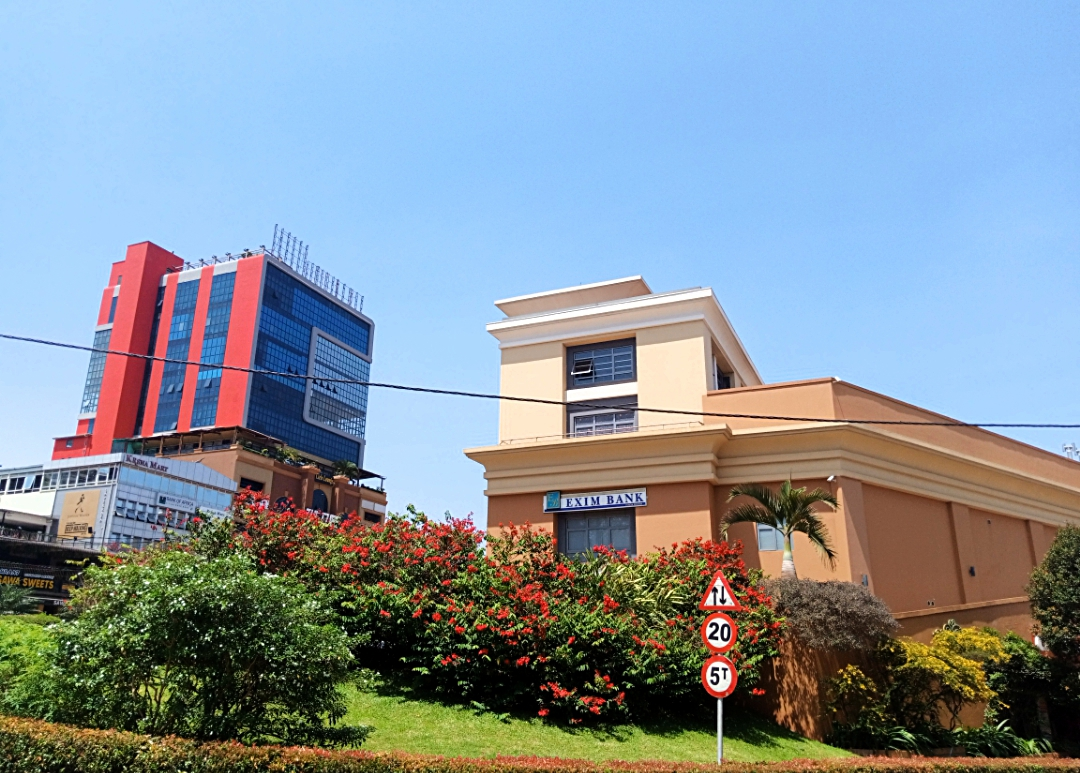
- Exim Bank (Uganda)
- Type: Private
- Industry: Financial services
- Founded: 2011
- Headquarters: 6 Hannington Road; Kampala, Uganda
- Key people: Sarah Nanziri Bagalaaliwo, chairperson Sabhapathy Krishnan Triplicane, CEO
- Products: Home loans, personal loans, vehicle loans, investments, checking and savings accounts, debit cards, bid bonds
- Revenue: ▼Aftertax:US$1,177,373 (UGX:4.419 billion) (2019)
- Total assets: US$90.91 million (UGX:341.2 billion) (2019)
- Number of employees: 180+ (2016)
- Parent: Exim Bank (Tanzania)
- Website: Homepage

Exim Bank (Uganda) (EBU), commonly known as Exim Bank, is a commercial bank in Uganda. It is one of the commercial banks licensed by the Bank of Uganda (BOU), the central bank and national banking regulator. EBU is a member of the Exim Bank Group (East Africa), a large financial services conglomerate with subsidiaries in Tanzania, Comoros, Uganda and Djibouti. The group also maintains a representative office in Ethiopia.

== Overview ==
This bank provides services to both individuals and corporate clients. As of December 2019, the bank's total assets were valued at approximately UGX 341.2 billion (approx. US$90.907 million). At that time, the bank's customer deposits were UGX 275.6 billion (approx. US$73.429 million).

== History ==
Exim Bank Uganda was established in 2011 as Imperial Bank Uganda by two major investors, Mukwano Group, a diversified Ugandan business and manufacturing conglomerate, and Imperial Bank Kenya, a medium-sized financial services provider, based in Nairobi, Kenya.

On 13 October 2015, following the death of the Imperial Bank Group's managing director, the Central Bank of Kenya placed Imperial Bank Kenya under statutory management due to "unsafe and unsound business conditions to transact business" at the parent company. BOU took over Imperial Bank Uganda the same day. BOU promptly put the Imperial Bank Group's shareholding on sale. On 7 March 2016, Exim Bank (Tanzania) acquired the ownership interest that Imperial Bank Kenya formerly had in this bank and re-branded it to Exim Bank (Uganda).

== Ownership ==
The stock of the bank is privately held. The detailed shareholding in Exim Bank (Uganda) as of March 2016 is depicted in the table below:

Exim Bank (Uganda) stock ownership
Rank	Name of owner	Percentage ownership
1	Exim Bank of Tanzania	58.6
2	Amazal Holdings Limited of Uganda	36.5
3	Export Finance Limited of Uganda	4.9
	Total	100.00

== Branch network ==
As of July 2022, the locations of the bank's branches included the following:

- Main branch - 6 Hannington Road, Kampala
- Kyaggwe branch - Mukwano Shopping Mall, 23-31 Rashid Khamis Road, Kampala
- Kikuubo branch - 24 Kikuubo Lane, Kampala
- Acacia Mall branch - Acacia Shopping Mall, Acacia Avenue, Kololo, Kampala
- Nakawa branch - Plot 1–2, Enterprise Close, Ntinda Industrial Area, Nakawa Division, Kampala
- Industrial Area branch - 86-96 Sixth Street, Industrial Area, Kampala
- Kisenyi branch - Kafumbe Mukasa Road, Kisenyi, Kampala

== Governance ==
The chairperson of the EBU Board is Sarah Nanziri Bagalaaliwo, a non-executive director. The chief executive officer is Henry Lugemwa Kyanjo, a non-shareholder.

== See also ==
- List of banks in Uganda
- Economy of Uganda
- Banking in Uganda
