= List of diplomatic missions of Germany =

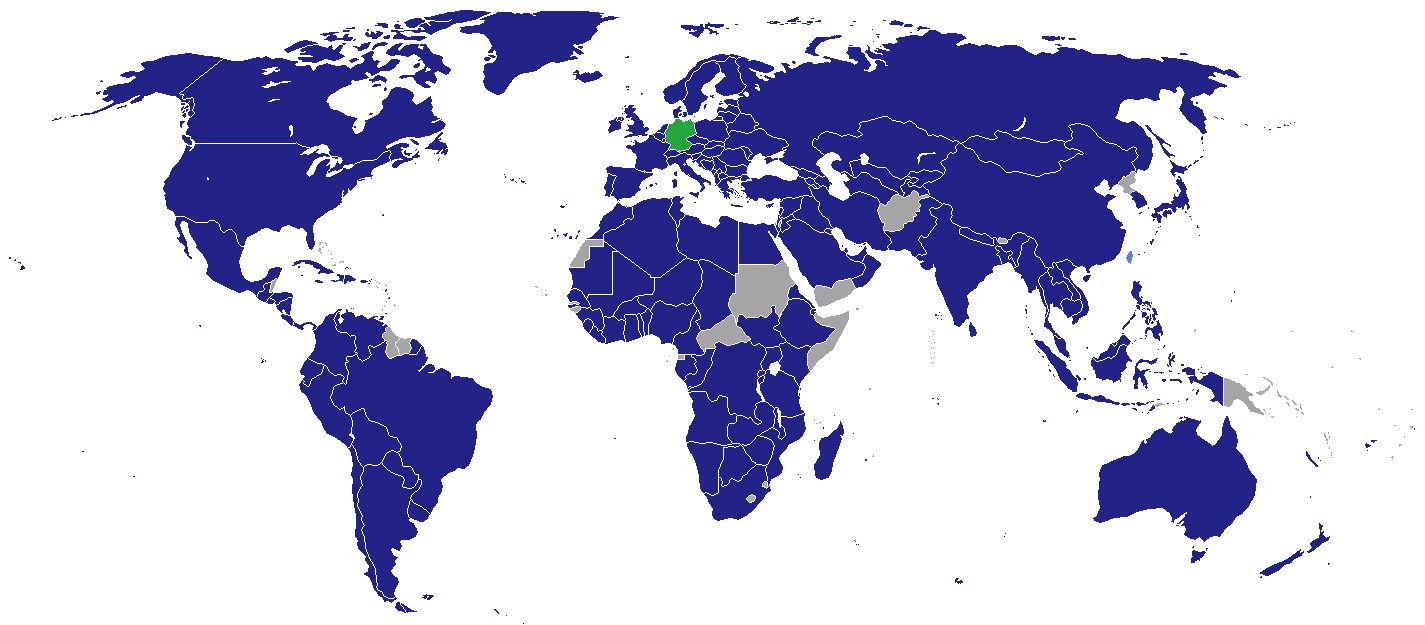
Diplomatic missions of Germany

The Federal Republic of Germany manages 227 diplomatic missions abroad. Of these, 153 are embassies, 52 consulates-general, 7 consulates, and 12 multilateral missions, making it one of the world's largest diplomatic networks.

In addition, there are 337 honorary consuls, which are not included in this list. Furthermore, Germany maintains a representative office in Ramallah and an institute in Taipei, which serves as de facto embassies to the State of Palestine and Taiwan, respectively.

When in a non-EU country where there is no German embassy, German citizens as EU citizens have the right to get consular protection from the embassy of any other EU country present in that country.

== History ==
Historically, the German state of Prussia and several smaller German states had sent emissaries abroad prior to the establishment of the North German Confederation, a precursor to the modern Federal Republic of Germany.

In 1874, Germany had only four embassies (in London, Paris, Saint Petersburg, and Vienna), but this was complemented by non-ambassadorial representation in the form of 14 ministerial posts (in Athens, Bern, Brussels, The Hague, Constantinople, Copenhagen, Lisbon, Madrid, Rome, Stockholm, Peking, Rio de Janeiro, Washington, D.C., and to the Holy See), seven consulates-general with diplomatic status (in Alexandria, Belgrade, Bucharest, London, New York City, Budapest, and Warsaw), and 37 consulates and vice-consulates headed by consular officers. By 1914, five additional embassies were established in Constantinople, Madrid, Rome, Washington, D.C., and Tokyo. The Foreign Office progressively reformed itself at this time to serve Germany's rising commercial and colonial interests abroad, as well as to reflect the professionalization of diplomacy generally.

Politics of the Third Reich affected the Foreign Office. In 1935 the Reich Citizenship Act led to the forced retirement of over 120 tenured civil servants. Positions and structures were created to imbed NSDAP representatives, and the SS began to be posted abroad as "police attachés". Under Joachim von Ribbentrop the Reich Foreign Ministry grew from 2,665 officers in 1938 to a peak of 6,458 in 1943, despite missions abroad closing as a consequence of the Second World War.

Germany's post-war diplomatic network started as early as 1949 with a mission in Paris to the newly formed Organisation for Economic Co-operation and Development. The following year consulates-general were (re)opened in London, New York City, Paris, Istanbul, Amsterdam, Brussels, Rome, and Athens (until 1951 these were not embassies, as by virtue of the Occupation Statute the three allied powers had competence of foreign affairs; these consulates were intended to just manage commercial & consular affairs). West Germany's Federal Foreign Office grew, and by the time of Germany's reunification in 1990, there were 214 diplomatic missions abroad. Following German reunification, the Federal Republic inherited several diplomatic representations of the Ministry for Foreign Affairs of former East Germany.

The West German embassy in Stockholm was occupied by the Red Army Faction in 1975. In 1989 its embassies in Budapest and Prague sheltered fleeing East Germans while waiting for permission to travel onwards to West Germany; permission was subsequently given by the Czechoslovak and Hungarian governments, accelerating the collapse of socialist hegemony in Eastern Europe.

== Current missions ==
=== Africa ===
Host country	Host city	Mission	Concurrent accreditation	Ref.
Algeria	Algiers	Embassy		
Angola	Luanda	Embassy		
Benin	Cotonou	Embassy		
Botswana	Gaborone	Embassy		
Burkina Faso	Ouagadougou	Embassy		
Burundi	Bujumbura	Embassy		
Cameroon	Yaoundé	Embassy	Countries: Central African Republic; Equatorial Guinea	
Chad	N'Djamena	Embassy		
Congo-Brazzaville	Brazzaville	Embassy		
Congo-Kinshasa	Kinshasa	Embassy		
Djibouti	Djibouti City	Embassy	Multilateral Organizations: Intergovernmental Authority on Development	
Egypt	Cairo	Embassy		
Eritrea	Asmara	Embassy		
Eswatini	Mbabane	Liaison office (Note: Subordinate to the embassy in Pretoria)		
Ethiopia	Addis Ababa	Embassy	Multilateral Organizations: African Union	
Gabon	Libreville	Embassy	Countries: São Tomé and Príncipe; Multilateral Organizations: Economic Community of Central African States	
Gambia	Banjul	Embassy		
Ghana	Accra	Embassy		
Guinea	Conakry	Embassy		
Guinea-Bissau	Bissau	Liaison office (Note: Subordinate to the embassy in Dakar)		
Ivory Coast	Abidjan	Embassy		
Kenya	Nairobi	Embassy	Countries: Seychelles; Somalia; Multilateral Organizations: United Nations; United Nations Environment Programme; United Nations Human Settlements Programme	
Liberia	Monrovia	Embassy		
Libya	Tripoli	Embassy		
Madagascar	Antananarivo	Embassy	Countries: Mauritius	
Malawi	Lilongwe	Embassy		
Mali	Bamako	Embassy		
Mauritania	Nouakchott	Embassy		
Morocco	Rabat	Embassy		
Mozambique	Maputo	Embassy		
Namibia	Windhoek	Embassy		
Niger	Niamey	Embassy		
Nigeria	Abuja	Embassy	Multilateral Organizations: Economic Community of West African States	
Nigeria	Lagos	Consulate-General	Multilateral Organizations: Economic Community of West African States	
Rwanda	Kigali	Embassy		
Senegal	Dakar	Embassy	Countries: Guinea-Bissau	
Sierra Leone	Freetown	Embassy		
South Africa	Pretoria	Embassy	Countries: Eswatini; Lesotho	
South Africa	Cape Town	Consulate-General	Countries: Eswatini; Lesotho	
South Sudan	Juba	Embassy		
Tanzania	Dar es Salaam	Embassy	Countries: Comoros	
Tanzania	Dodoma	Liaison office	Countries: Comoros	
Togo	Lomé	Embassy		
Tunisia	Tunis	Embassy		
Uganda	Kampala	Embassy		
Zambia	Lusaka	Embassy	Multilateral Organizations: Common Market for Eastern and Southern Africa	
Zimbabwe	Harare	Embassy		

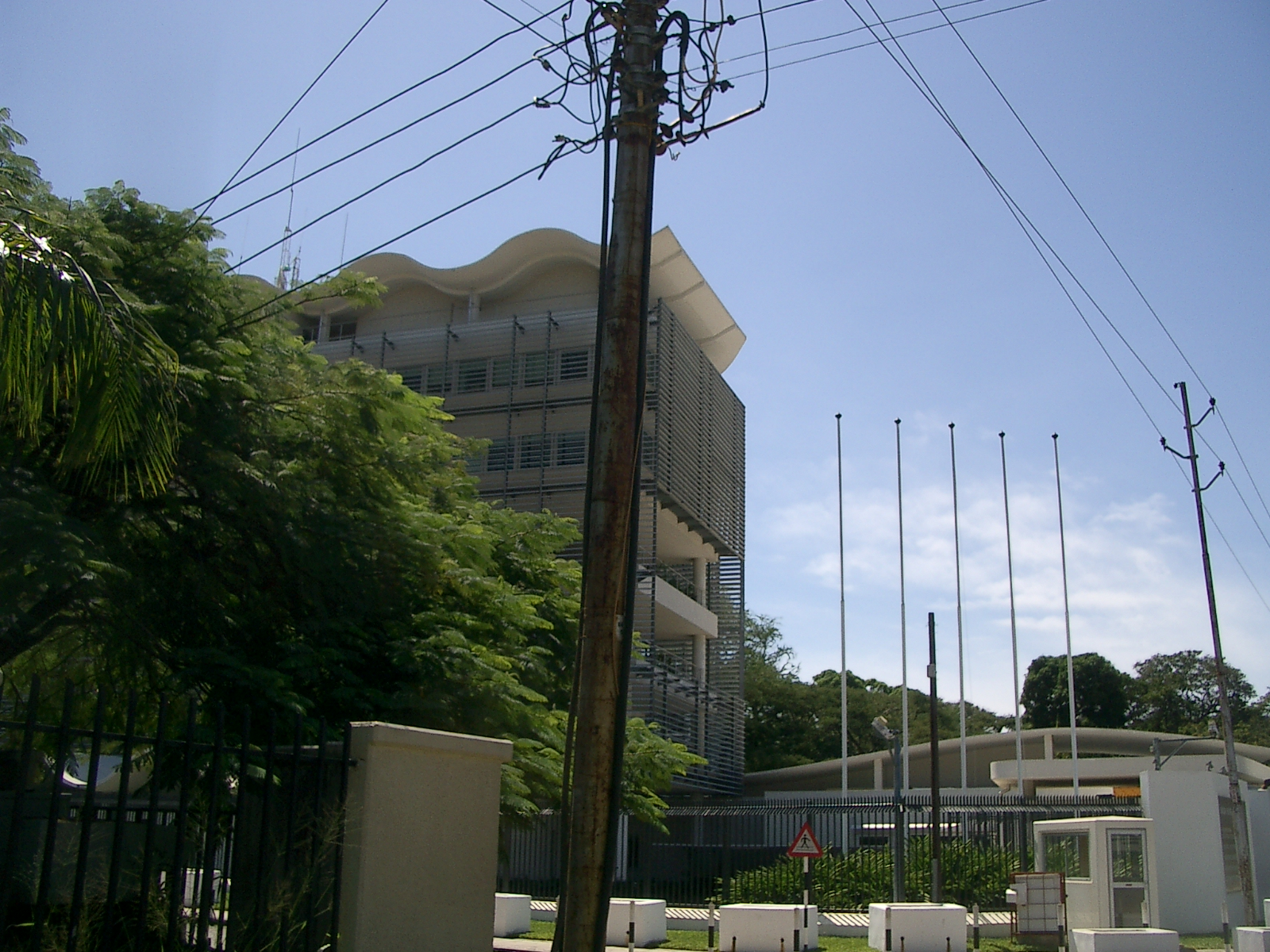
Embassy in Dar es Salaam

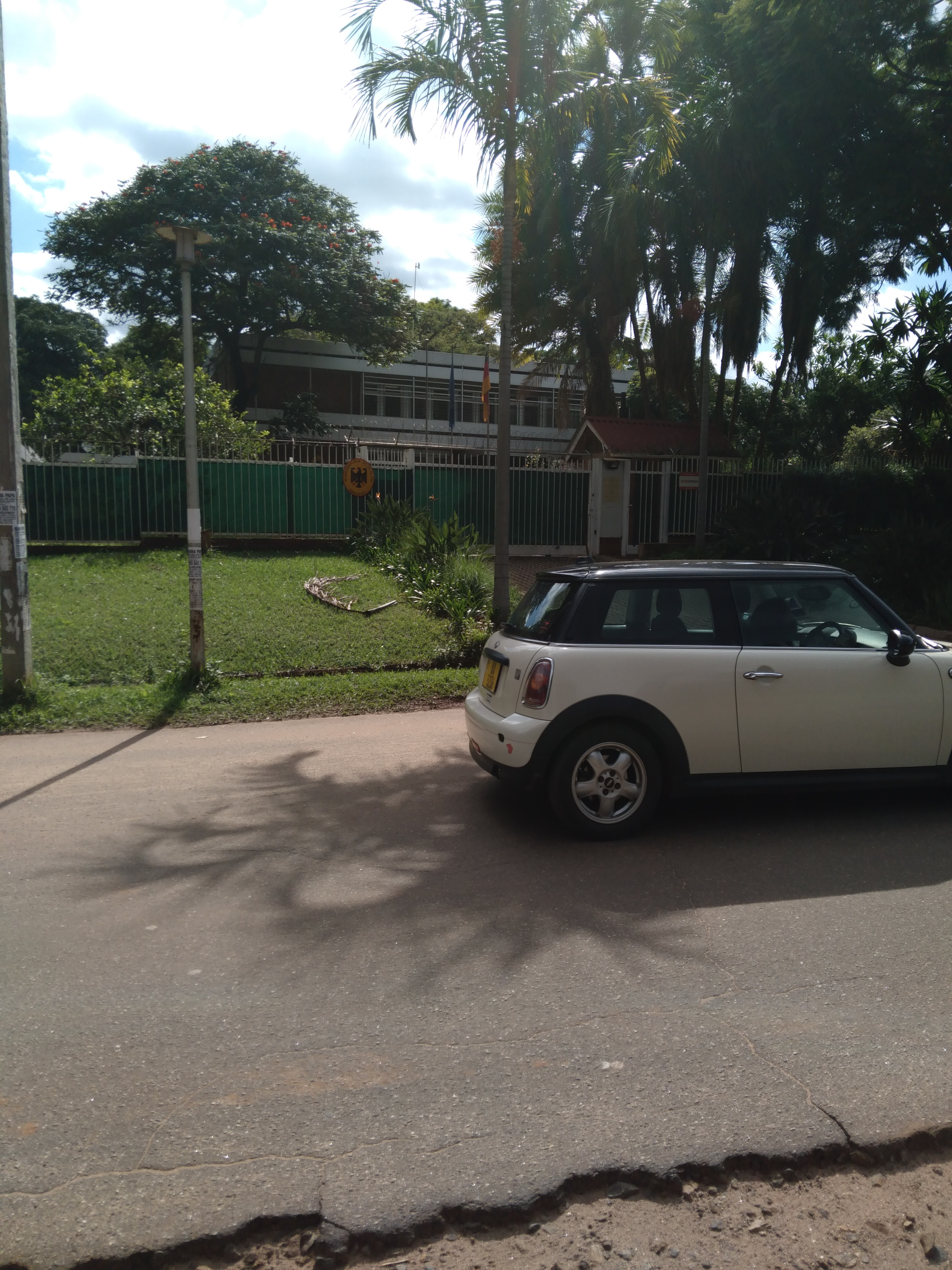
Embassy in Lilongwe

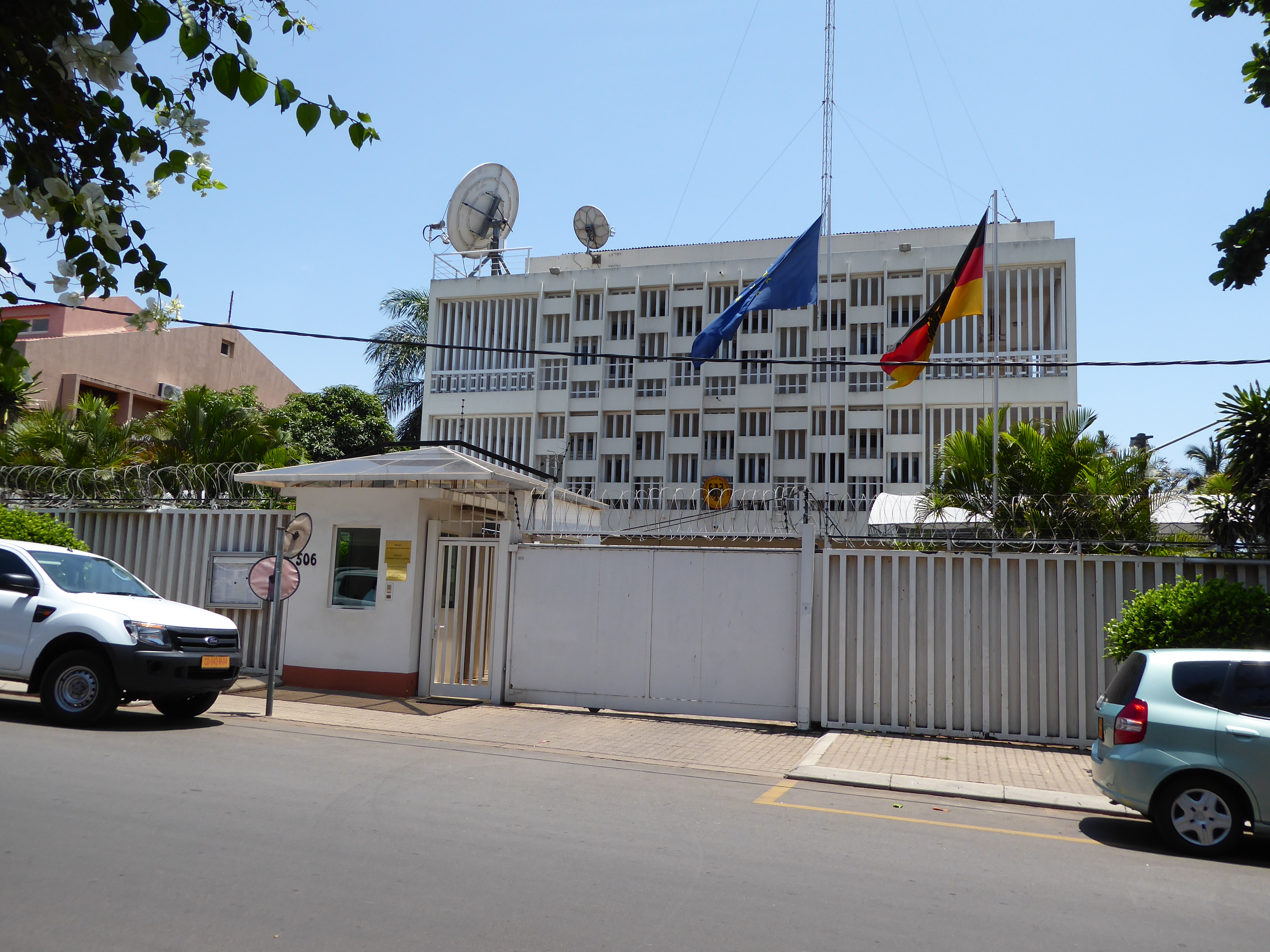
Embassy in Maputo

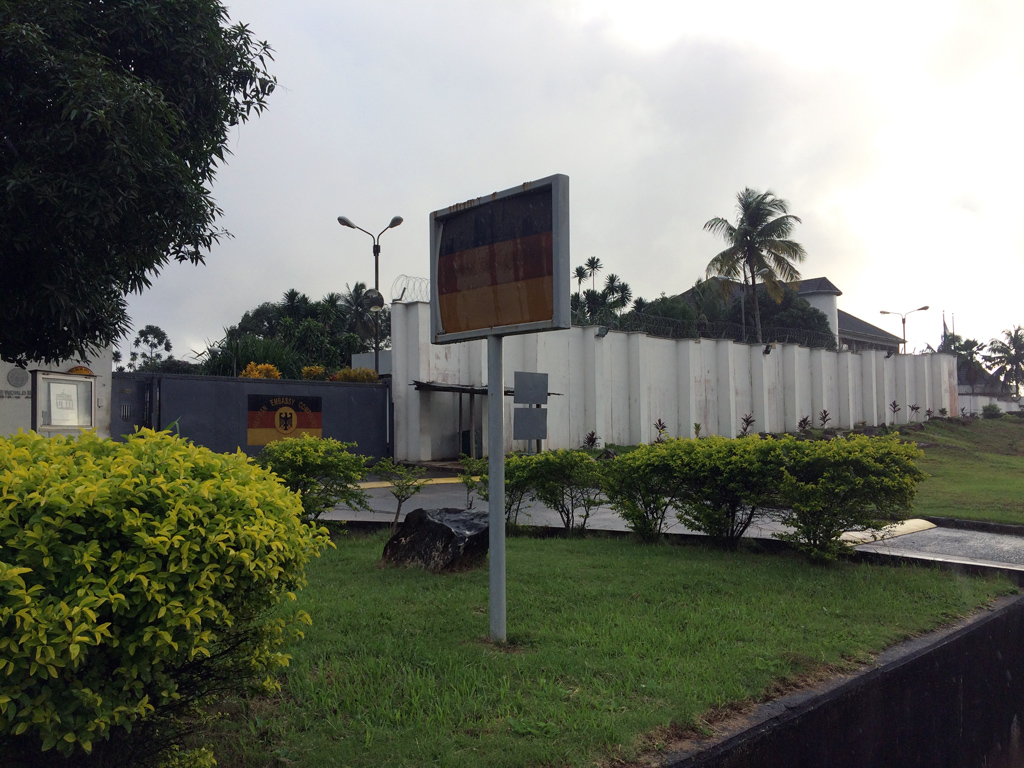
Embassy in Monrovia

=== Americas ===
Host country	Host city	Mission	Concurrent accreditation	Ref.
Argentina	Buenos Aires	Embassy		
Bolivia	La Paz	Embassy		
Brazil	Brasília	Embassy		
Brazil	Porto Alegre	Consulate-General		
Brazil	Recife	Consulate-General		
Brazil	Rio de Janeiro	Consulate-General		
Brazil	São Paulo	Consulate-General		
Canada	Ottawa	Embassy		
Canada	Montreal	Consulate-General		
Canada	Toronto	Consulate-General		
Canada	Vancouver	Consulate-General		
Chile	Santiago de Chile	Embassy		
Colombia	Bogotá	Embassy		
Costa Rica	San José	Embassy		
Cuba	Havana	Embassy		
Dominican Republic	Santo Domingo	Embassy		
Ecuador	Quito	Embassy		
El Salvador	San Salvador	Embassy		
Guatemala	Guatemala City	Embassy	Countries: Belize	
Haiti	Port-au-Prince	Embassy		
Honduras	Tegucigalpa	Embassy		
Jamaica	Kingston	Embassy	Countries: Bahamas	
Mexico	Mexico City	Embassy		
Nicaragua	Managua	Embassy		
Panama	Panama City	Embassy		
Paraguay	Asunción	Embassy		
Peru	Lima	Embassy		
Trinidad and Tobago	Port of Spain	Embassy	Countries: Antigua and Barbuda; Barbados; Dominica; Grenada; Guyana; Saint Kitts and Nevis; Saint Lucia; Saint Vincent and the Grenadines; Suriname	
United States	Washington, D.C.	Embassy	Multilateral Organizations: Organization of American States (Note: Accredited as an observer mission.)	
United States	Atlanta	Consulate-General	Multilateral Organizations: Organization of American States	
United States	Boston	Consulate-General	Multilateral Organizations: Organization of American States	
United States	Chicago	Consulate-General	Multilateral Organizations: Organization of American States	
United States	Houston	Consulate-General	Multilateral Organizations: Organization of American States	
United States	Los Angeles	Consulate-General	Multilateral Organizations: Organization of American States	
United States	Miami	Consulate-General	Multilateral Organizations: Organization of American States	
United States	New York City	Consulate-General	Multilateral Organizations: Organization of American States	
United States	San Francisco	Consulate-General	Multilateral Organizations: Organization of American States	
Uruguay	Montevideo	Embassy		
Venezuela	Caracas	Embassy		

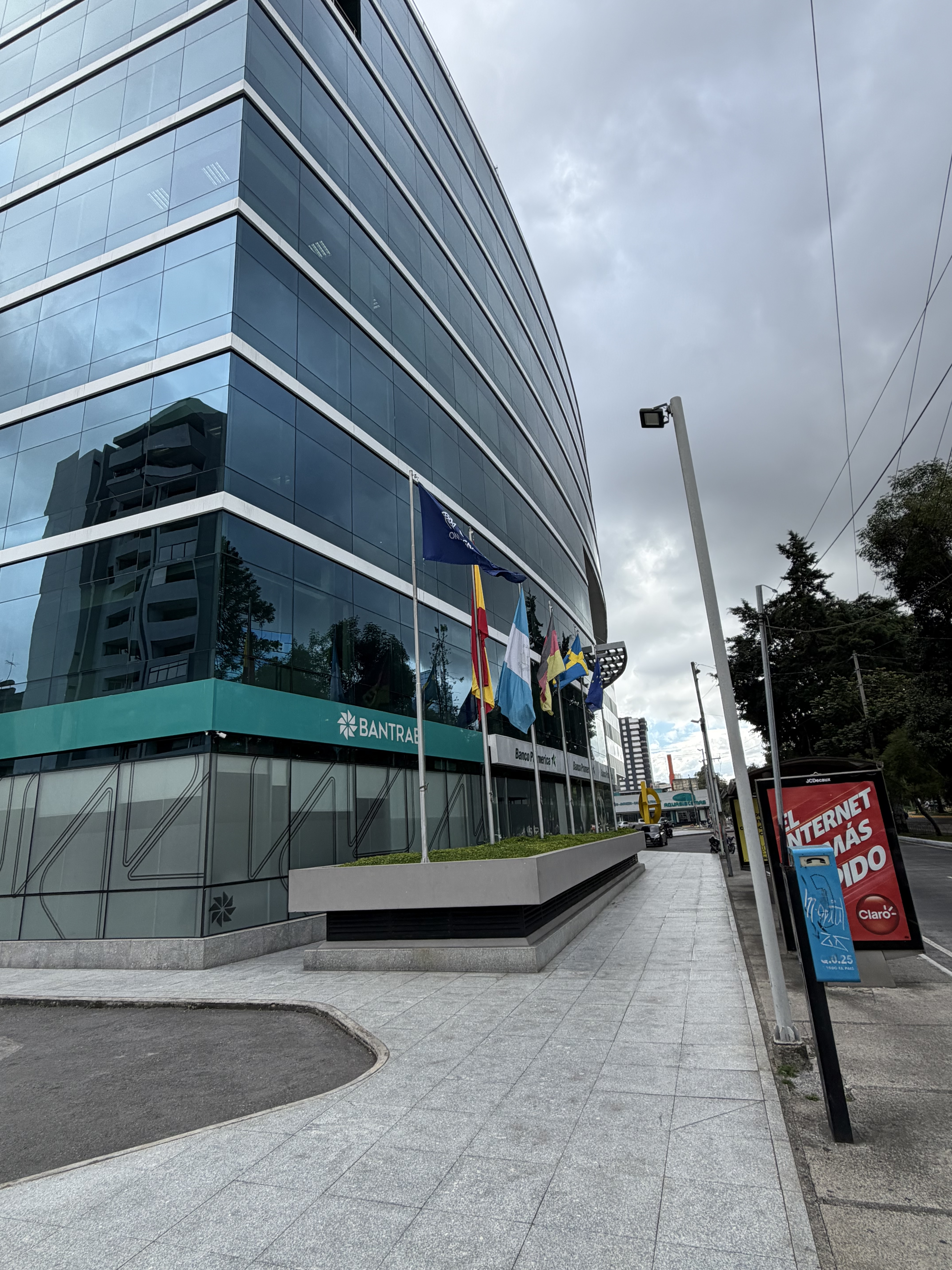
Building hosting the Embassy in Guatemala City

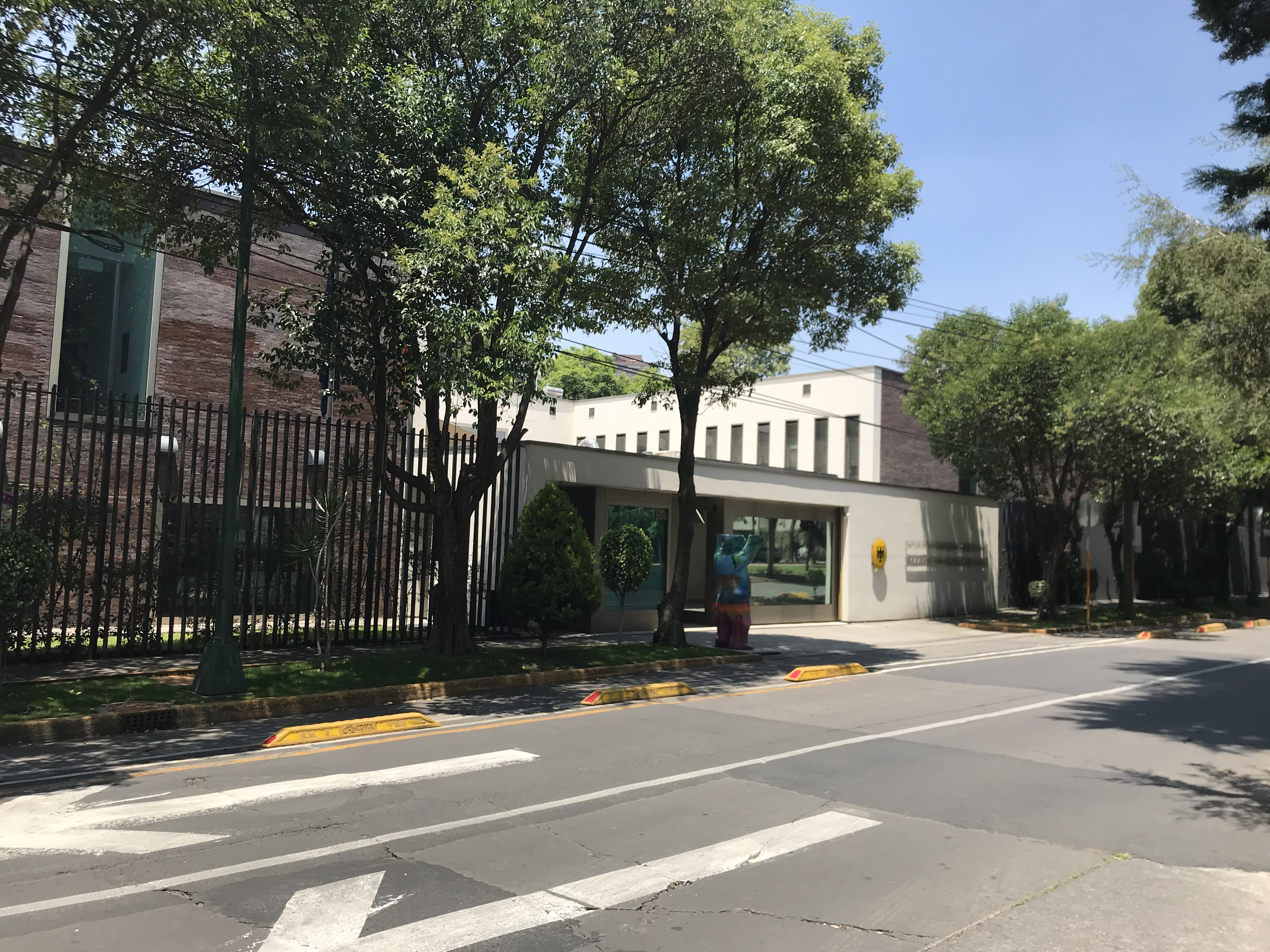
Embassy in Mexico City

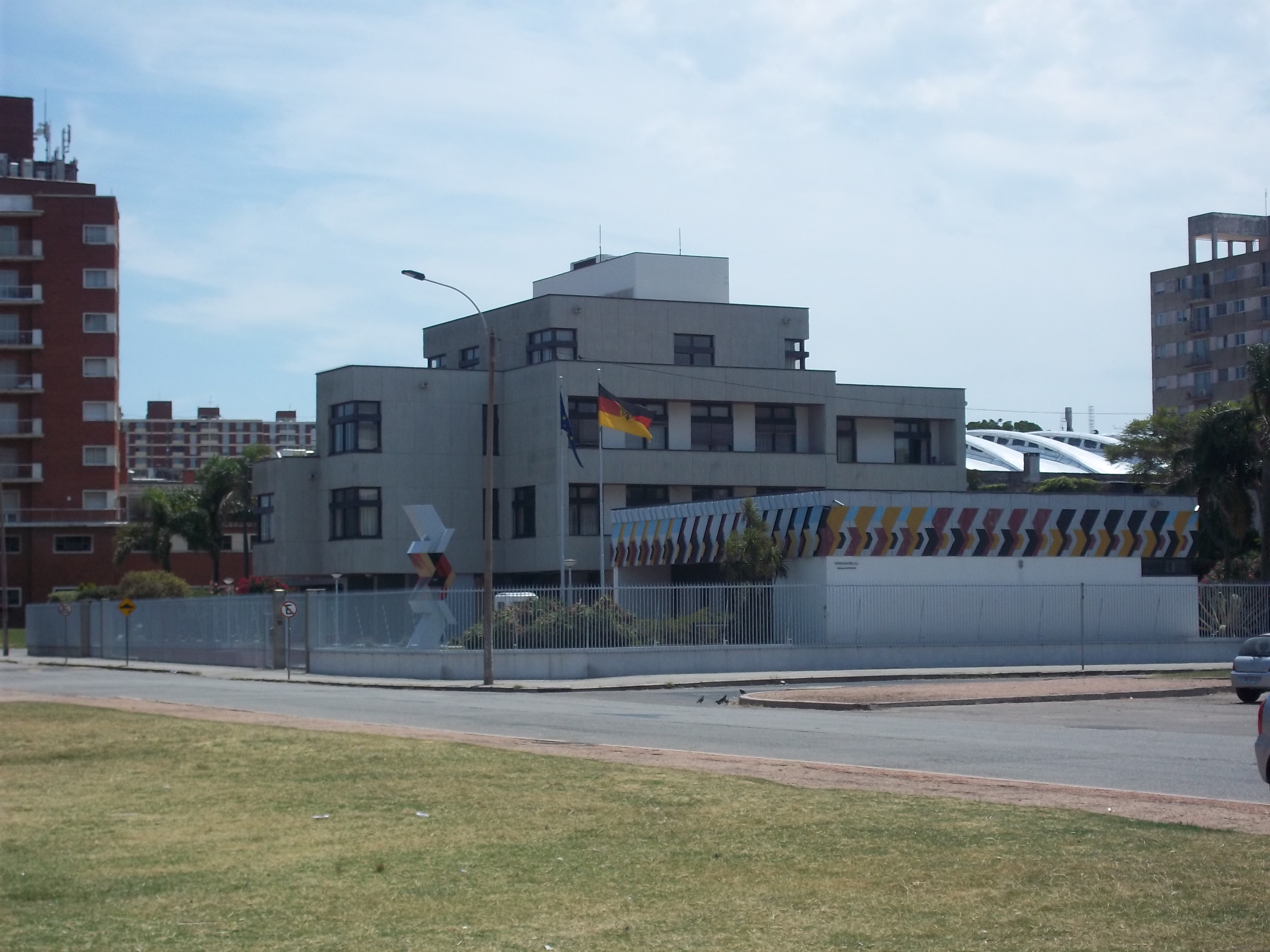
Embassy in Montevideo

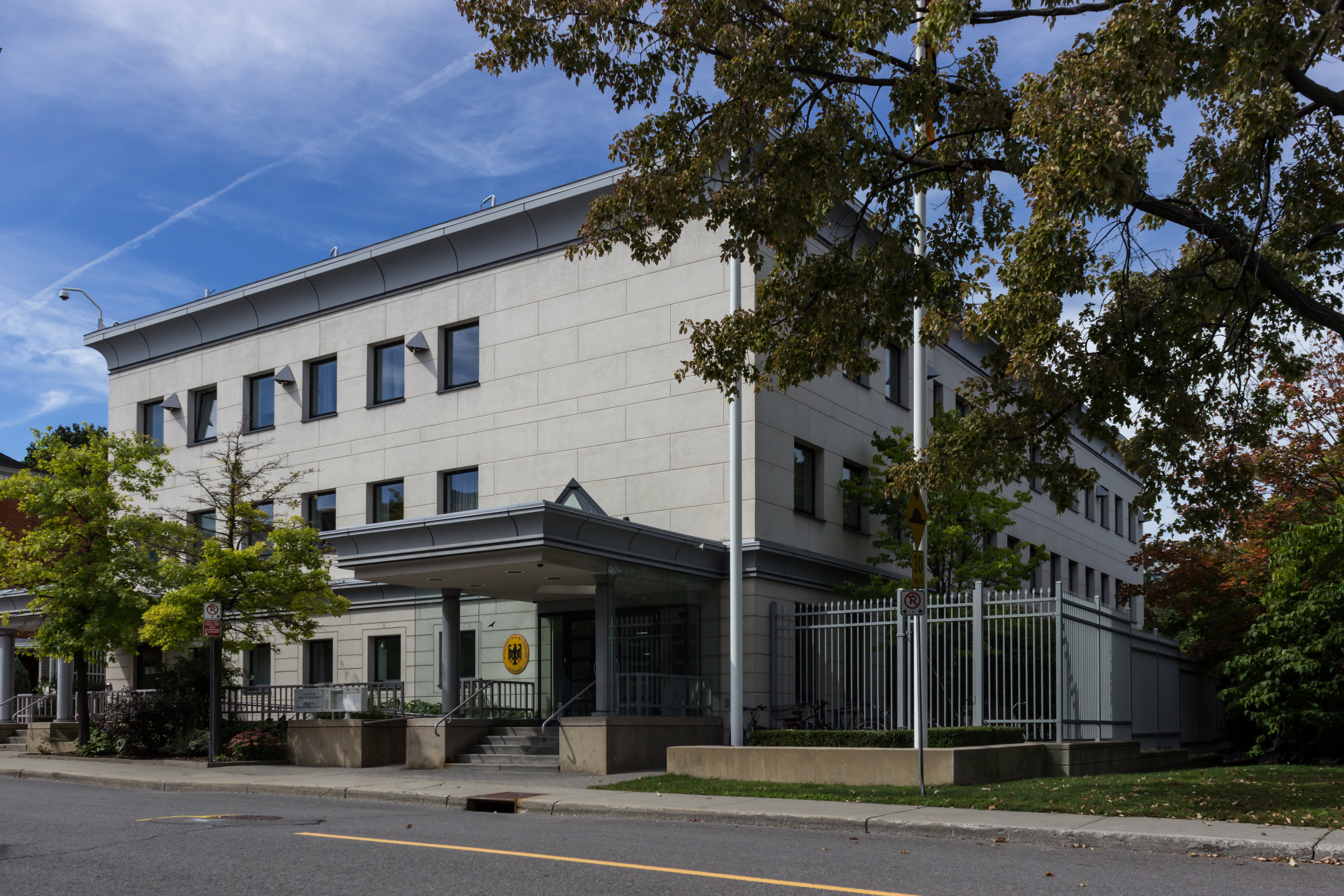
Embassy in Ottawa

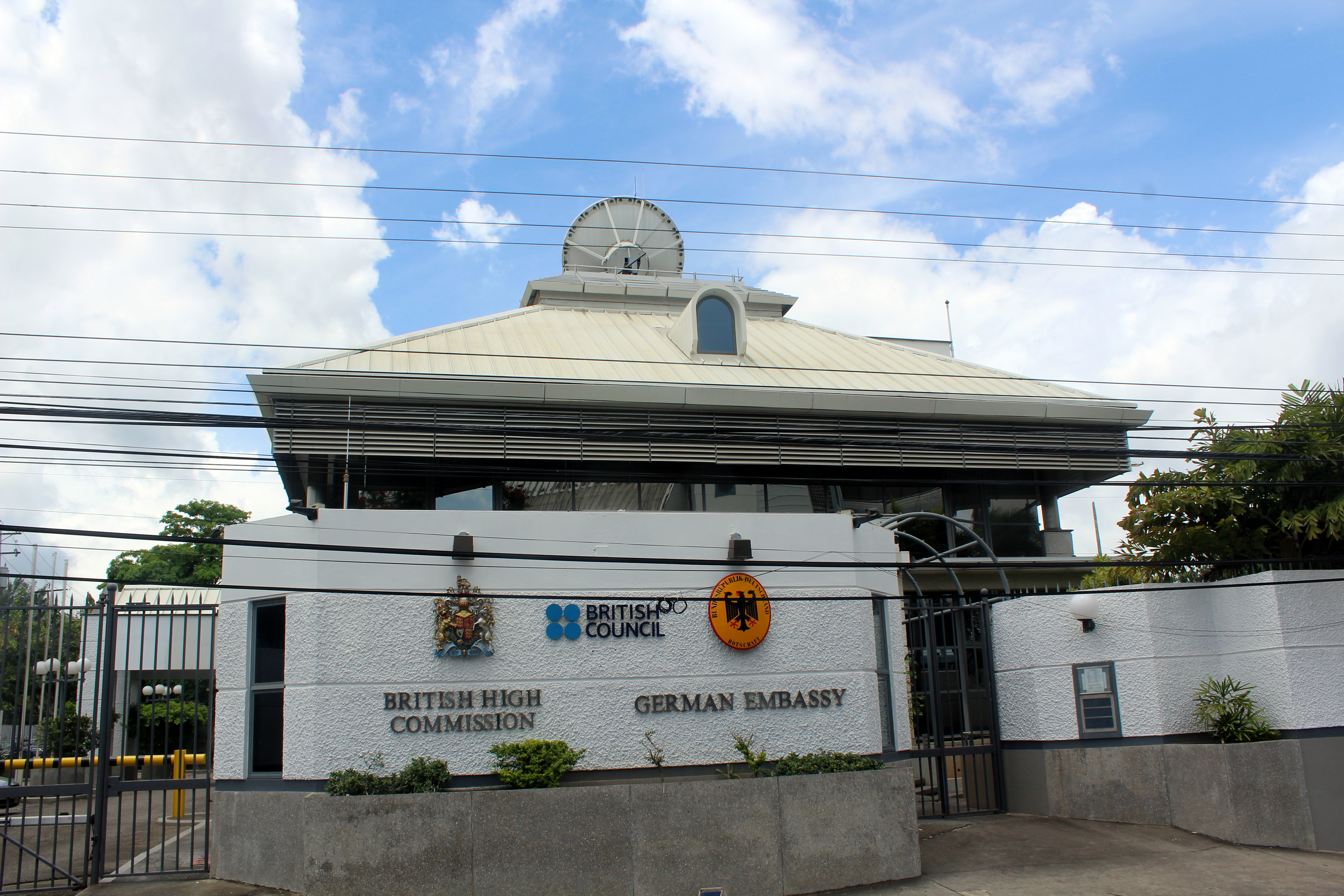
Embassy in Port of Spain

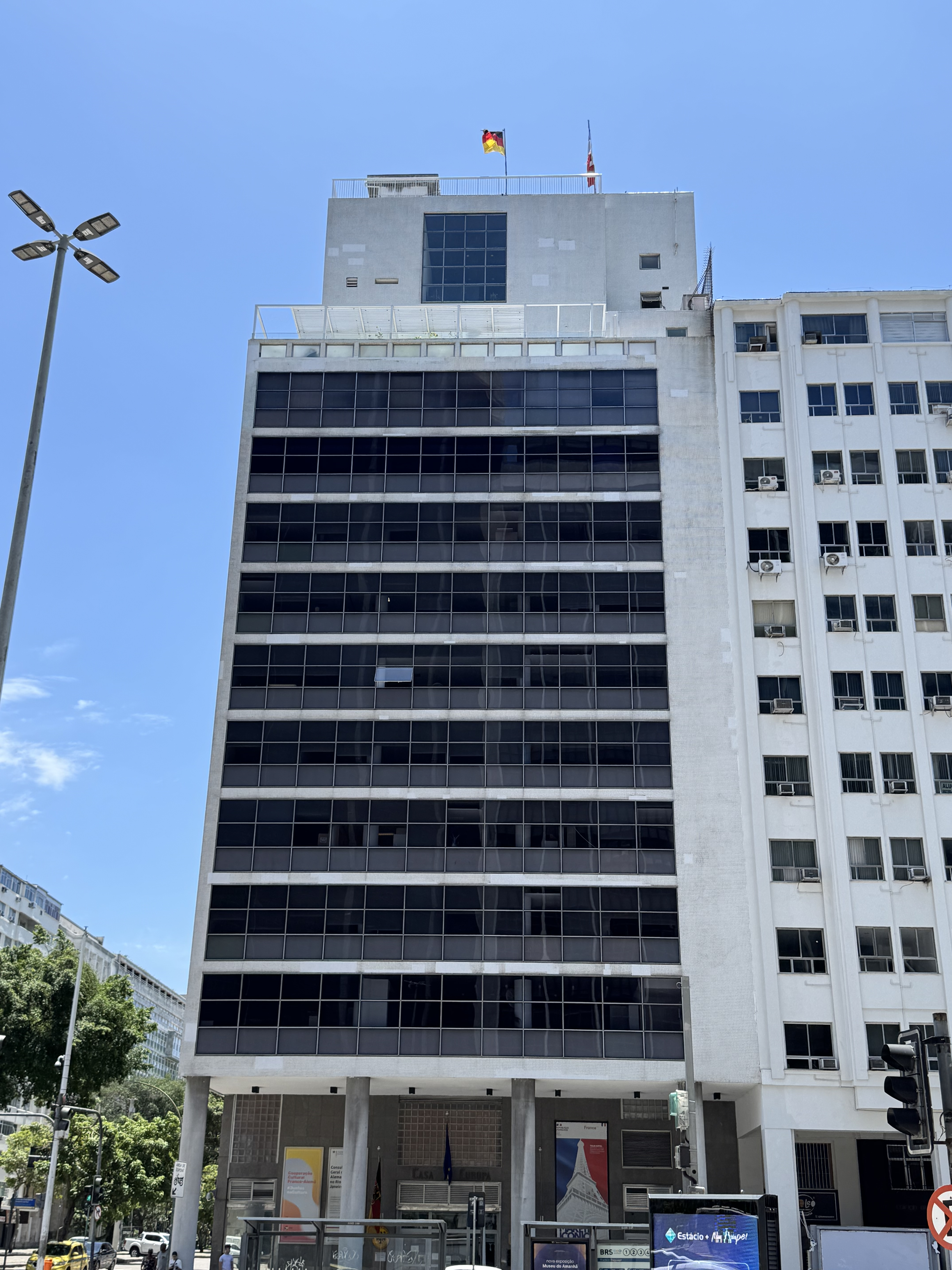
Consulate-General in Rio de Janeiro

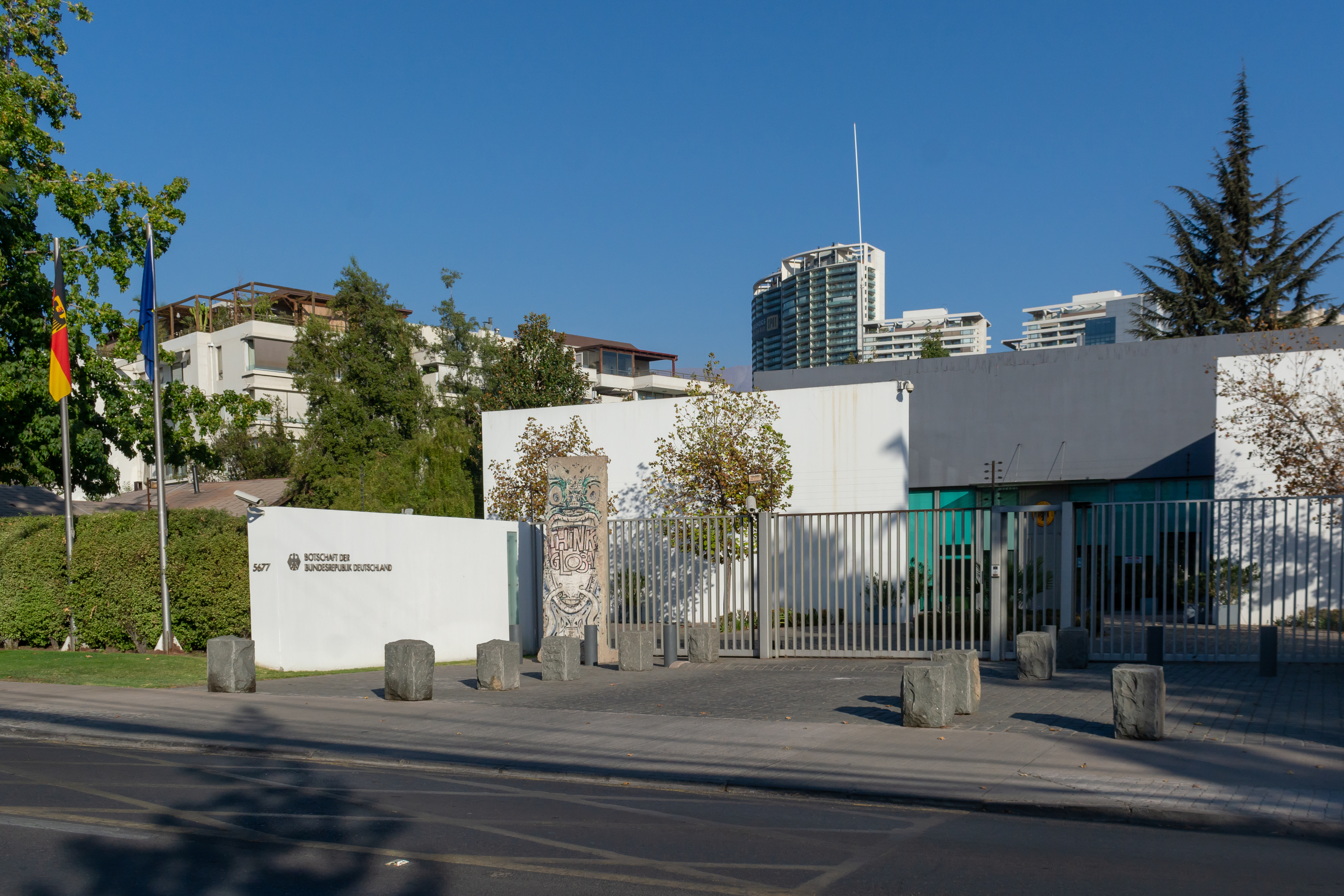
Embassy in Santiago

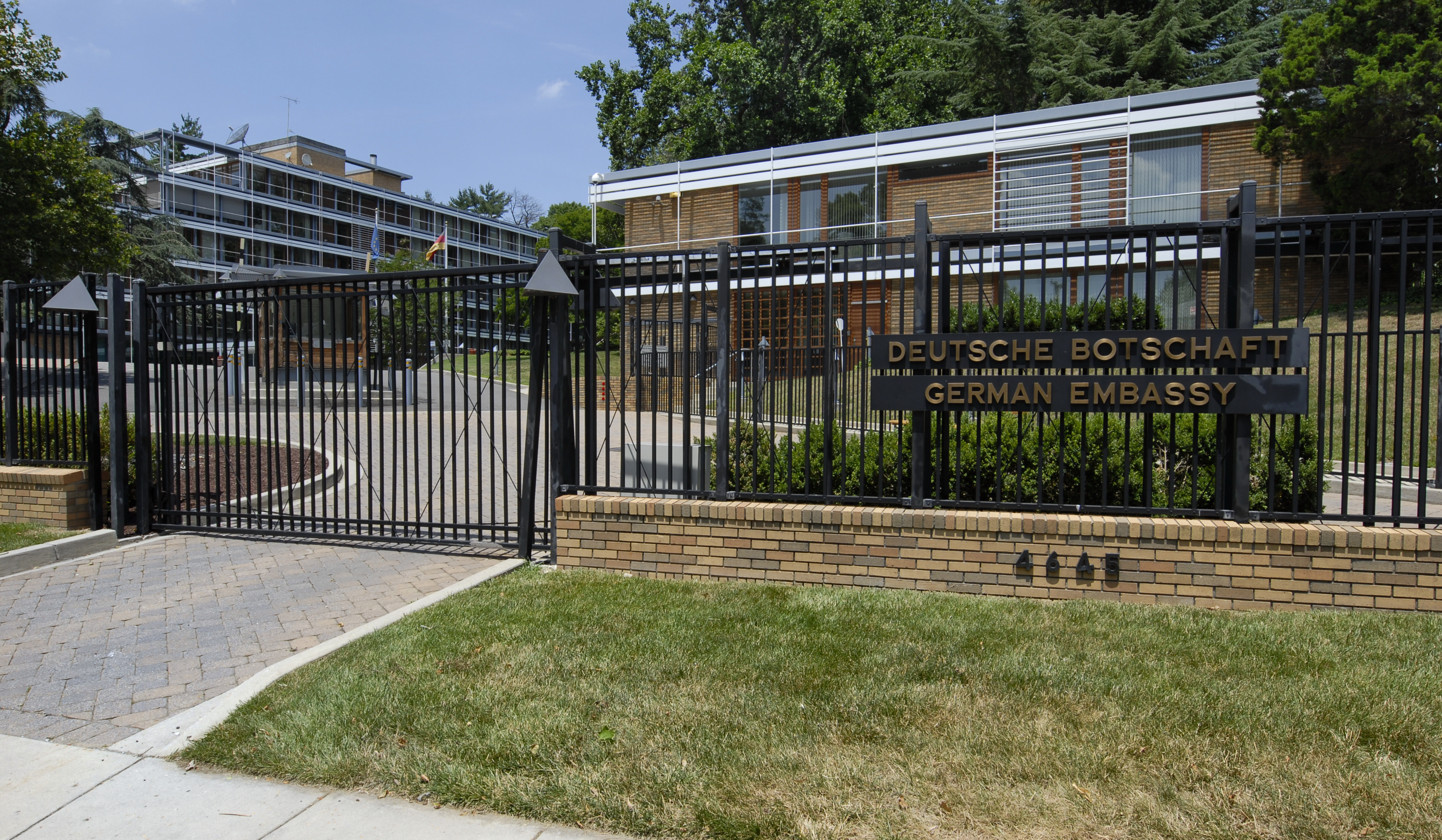
Embassy in Washington, D.C.

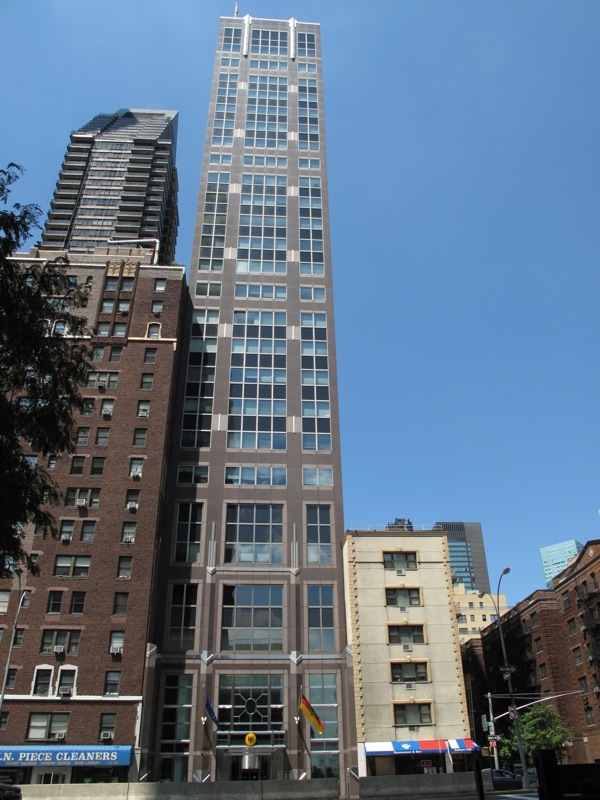
Consulate-General and Permanent Mission to the United Nations in New York City

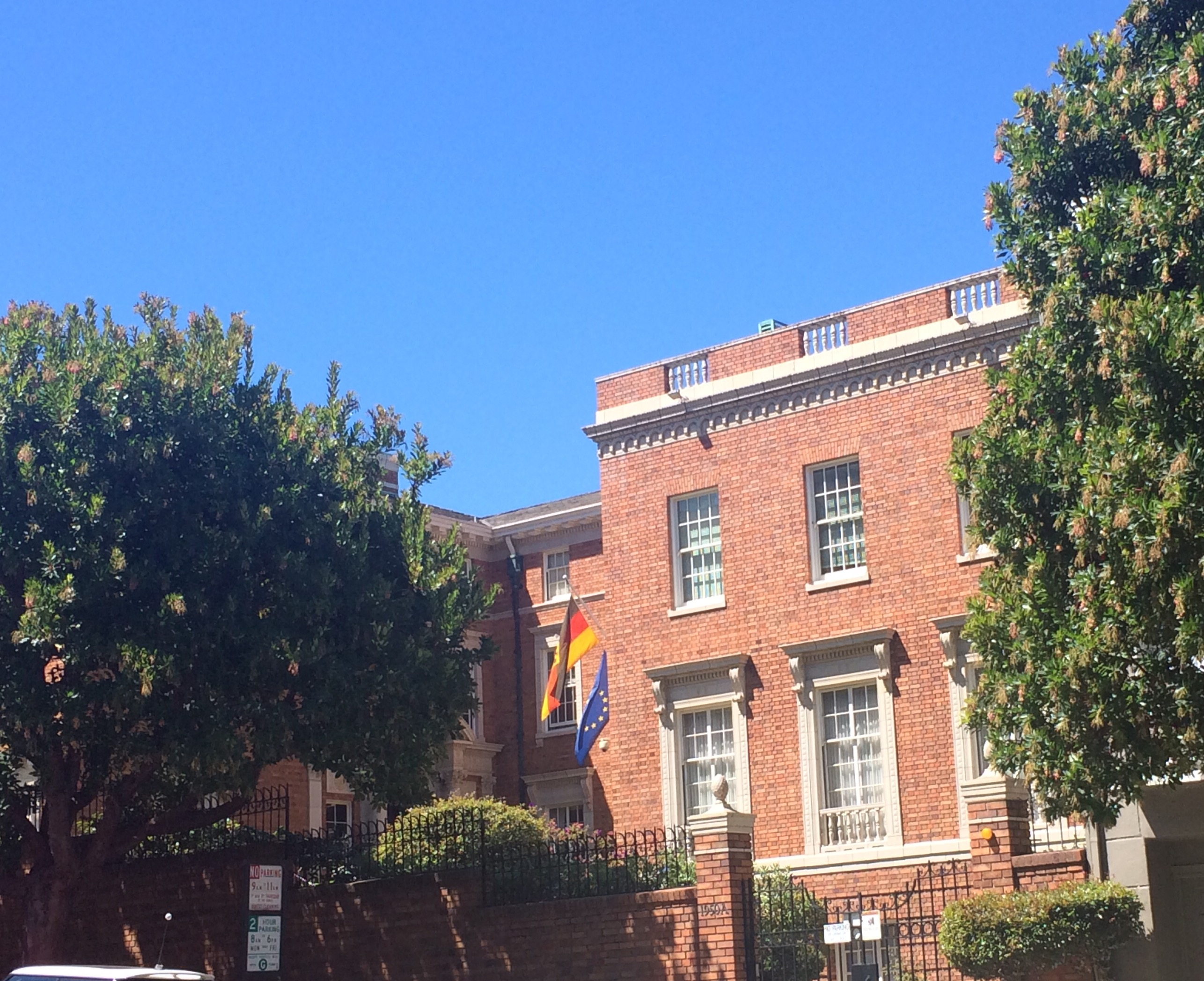
Consulate-General in San Francisco

=== Asia ===
Host country	Host city	Mission	Concurrent accreditation	Ref.
Armenia	Yerevan	Embassy		
Azerbaijan	Baku	Embassy		
Bahrain	Manama	Embassy		
Bangladesh	Dhaka	Embassy		
Brunei	Bandar Seri Begawan	Embassy		
Cambodia	Phnom Penh	Embassy		
China	Beijing	Embassy		
China	Chengdu	Consulate-General		
China	Guangzhou	Consulate-General		
China	Hong Kong	Consulate-General		
China	Shanghai	Consulate-General		
China	Shenyang	Consulate-General		
Georgia	Tbilisi	Embassy		
India	New Delhi	Embassy	Countries: Bhutan	
India	Bengaluru	Consulate-General	Countries: Bhutan	
India	Chennai	Consulate-General	Countries: Bhutan	
India	Kolkata	Consulate-General	Countries: Bhutan	
India	Mumbai	Consulate-General	Countries: Bhutan	
Indonesia	Jakarta	Embassy	Countries: East Timor; Multilateral Organizations: Association of Southeast Asian Nations	
Iraq	Baghdad	Embassy		
Iraq	Erbil	Consulate-General		
Iran	Tehran	Embassy		
Israel	Tel Aviv	Embassy		
Japan	Tokyo	Embassy		
Japan	Osaka	Consulate-General		
Jordan	Amman	Embassy		
Kazakhstan	Astana	Embassy		
Kazakhstan	Almaty	Consulate-General		
Kuwait	Kuwait City	Embassy		
Kyrgyzstan	Bishkek	Embassy		
Laos	Vientiane	Embassy		
Lebanon	Beirut	Embassy		
Malaysia	Kuala Lumpur	Embassy		
Mongolia	Ulaanbaatar	Embassy		
Myanmar	Yangon	Embassy		
Nepal	Kathmandu	Embassy		
Oman	Muscat	Embassy		
Pakistan	Islamabad	Embassy		
Pakistan	Karachi	Consulate-General		
Palestine	Ramallah	Representative Office		
Philippines	Manila	Embassy	Countries: Marshall Islands; Micronesia; Palau	
Qatar	Doha	Embassy		
Republic of China (Taiwan)	Taipei	Institute		
Saudi Arabia	Riyadh	Embassy		
Saudi Arabia	Jeddah	Consulate-General		
Singapore	Singapore	Embassy		
South Korea	Seoul	Embassy		
Sri Lanka	Colombo	Embassy	Countries: Maldives	
Syria	Damascus	Embassy		
Tajikistan	Dushanbe	Embassy		
Thailand	Bangkok	Embassy		
Turkey	Ankara	Embassy		
Turkey	Istanbul	Consulate-General		
Turkey	İzmir	Consulate-General		
Turkey	Antalya	Consulate		
Turkmenistan	Ashgabat	Embassy		
United Arab Emirates	Abu Dhabi	Embassy		
United Arab Emirates	Dubai	Consulate-General		
Uzbekistan	Tashkent	Embassy		
Vietnam	Hanoi	Embassy		
Vietnam	Ho Chi Minh City	Consulate-General		

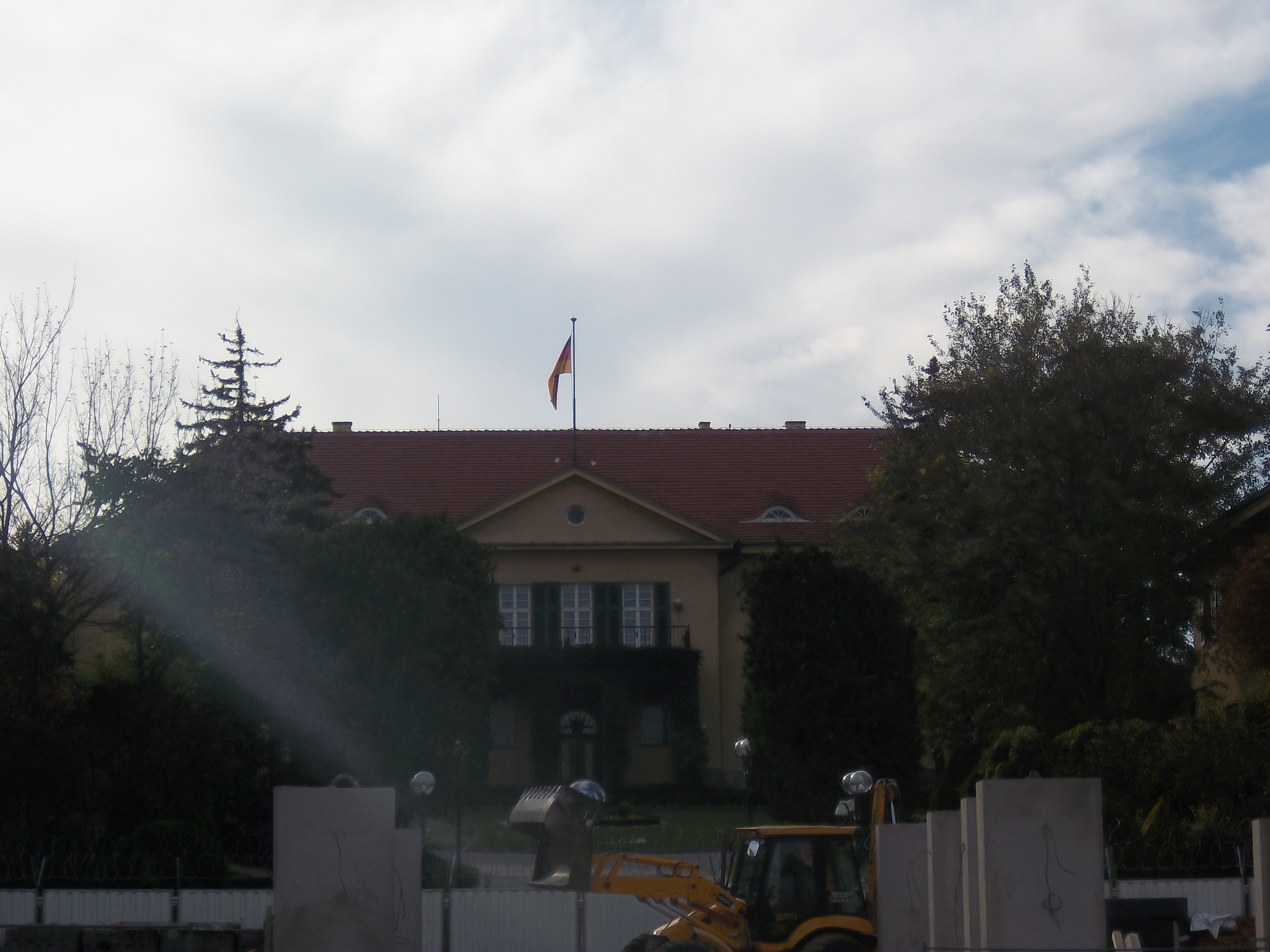
Embassy in Ankara

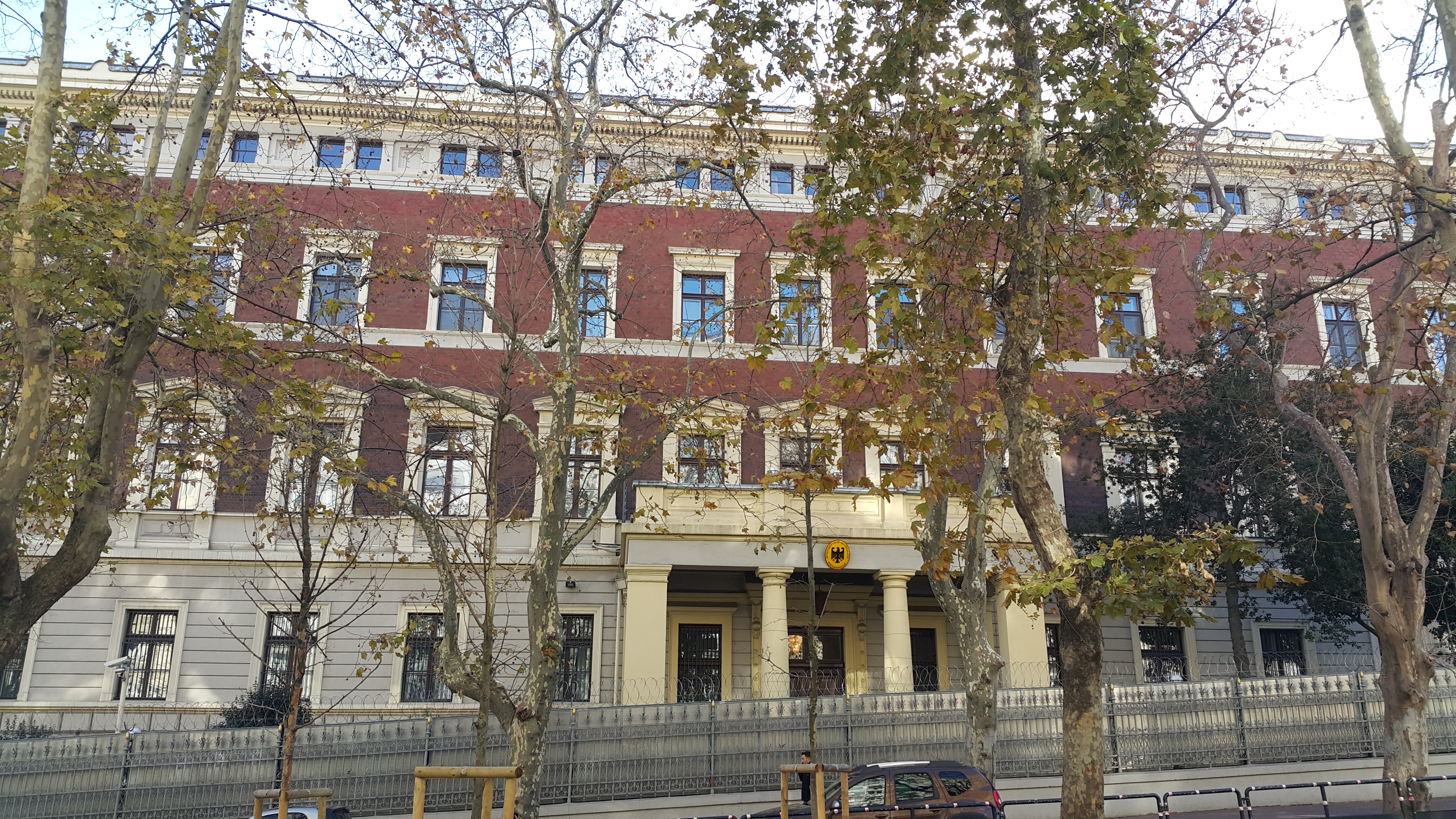
Former German embassy building, now Consulate-General in Istanbul

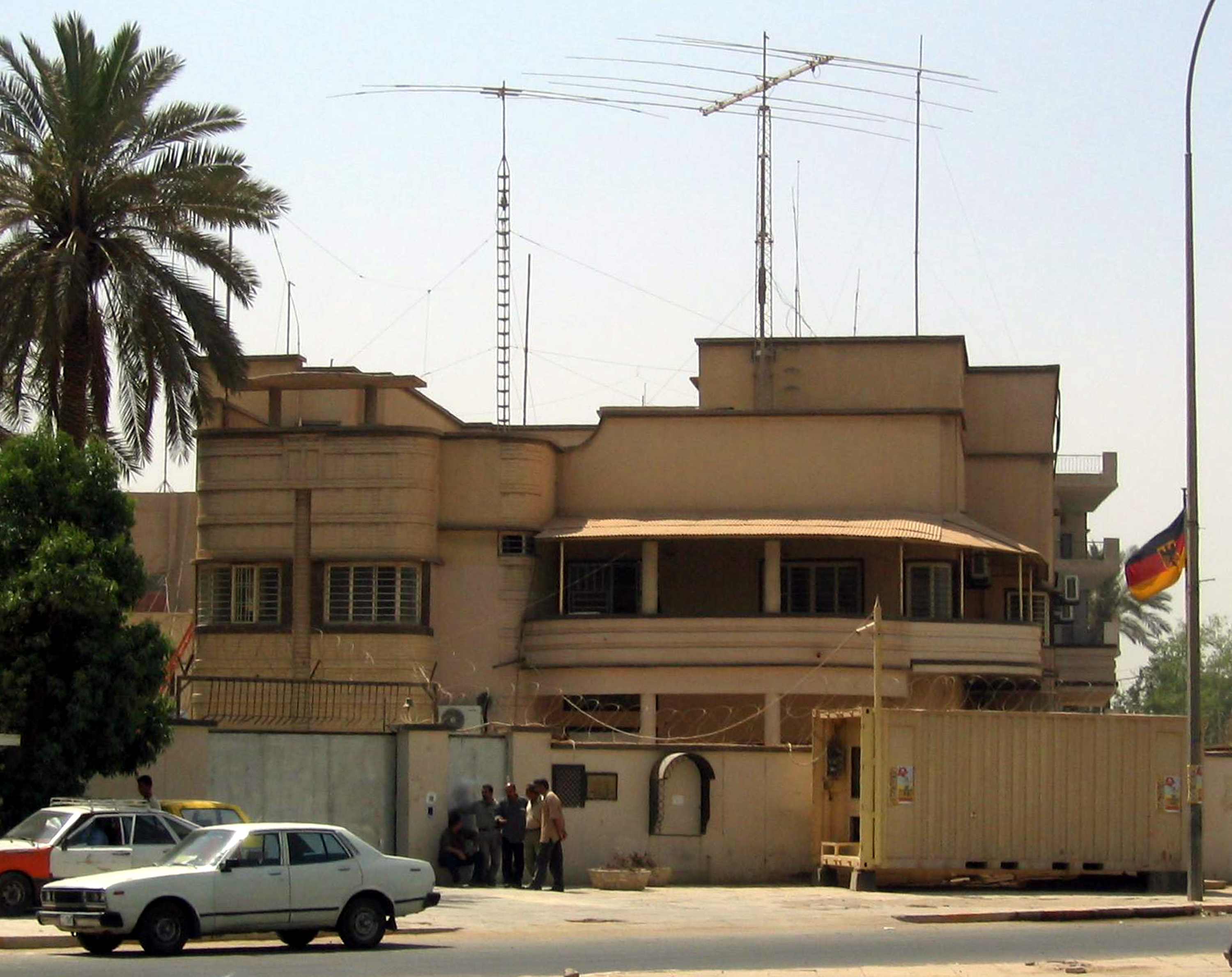
Embassy in Baghdad

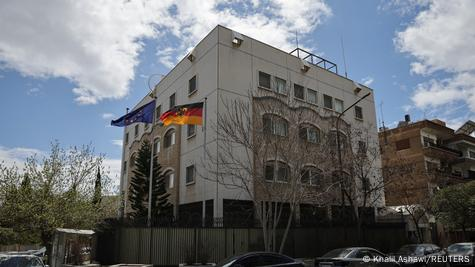
Embassy in Damascus

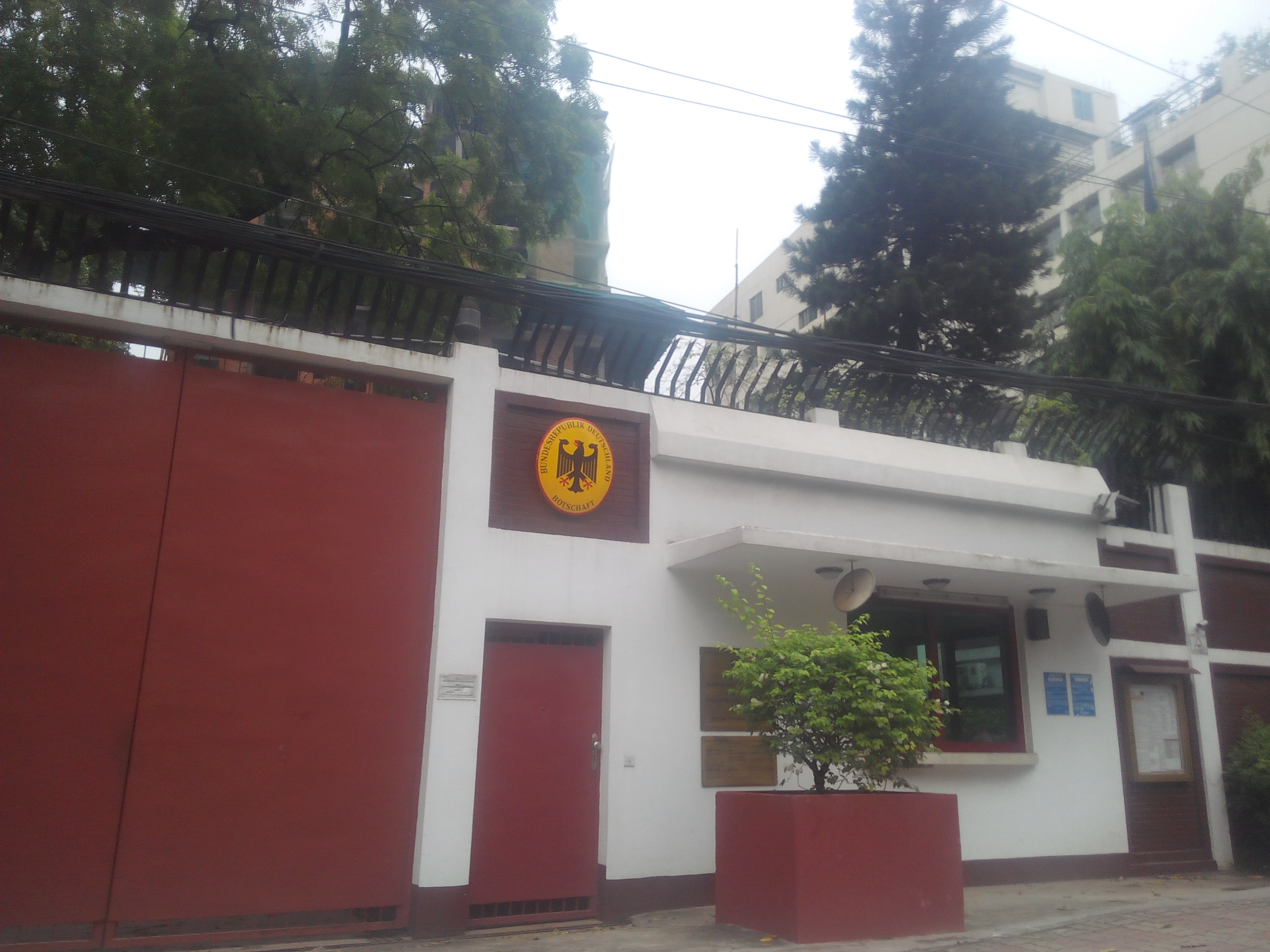
Embassy in Dhaka

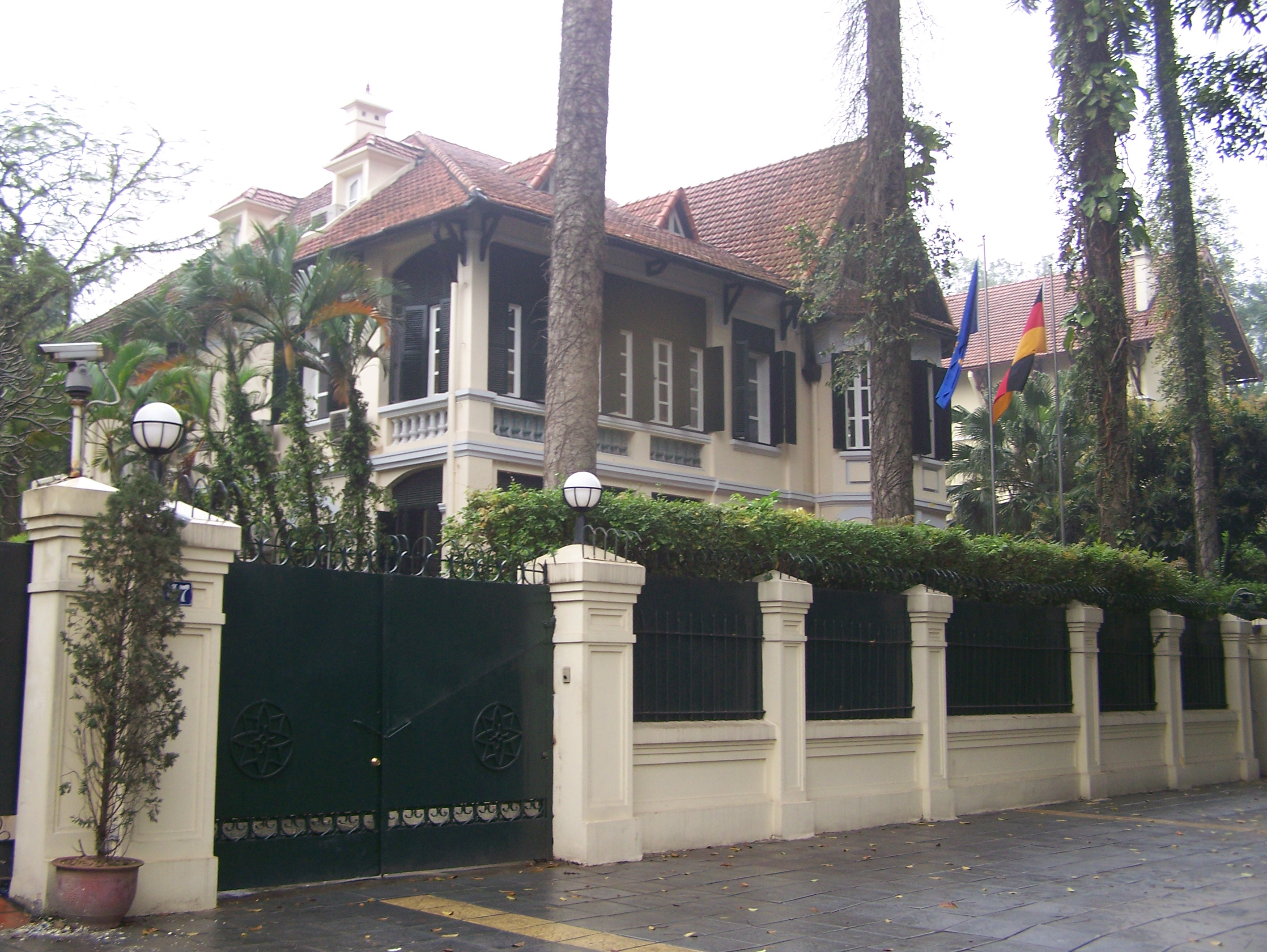
Embassy in Hanoi

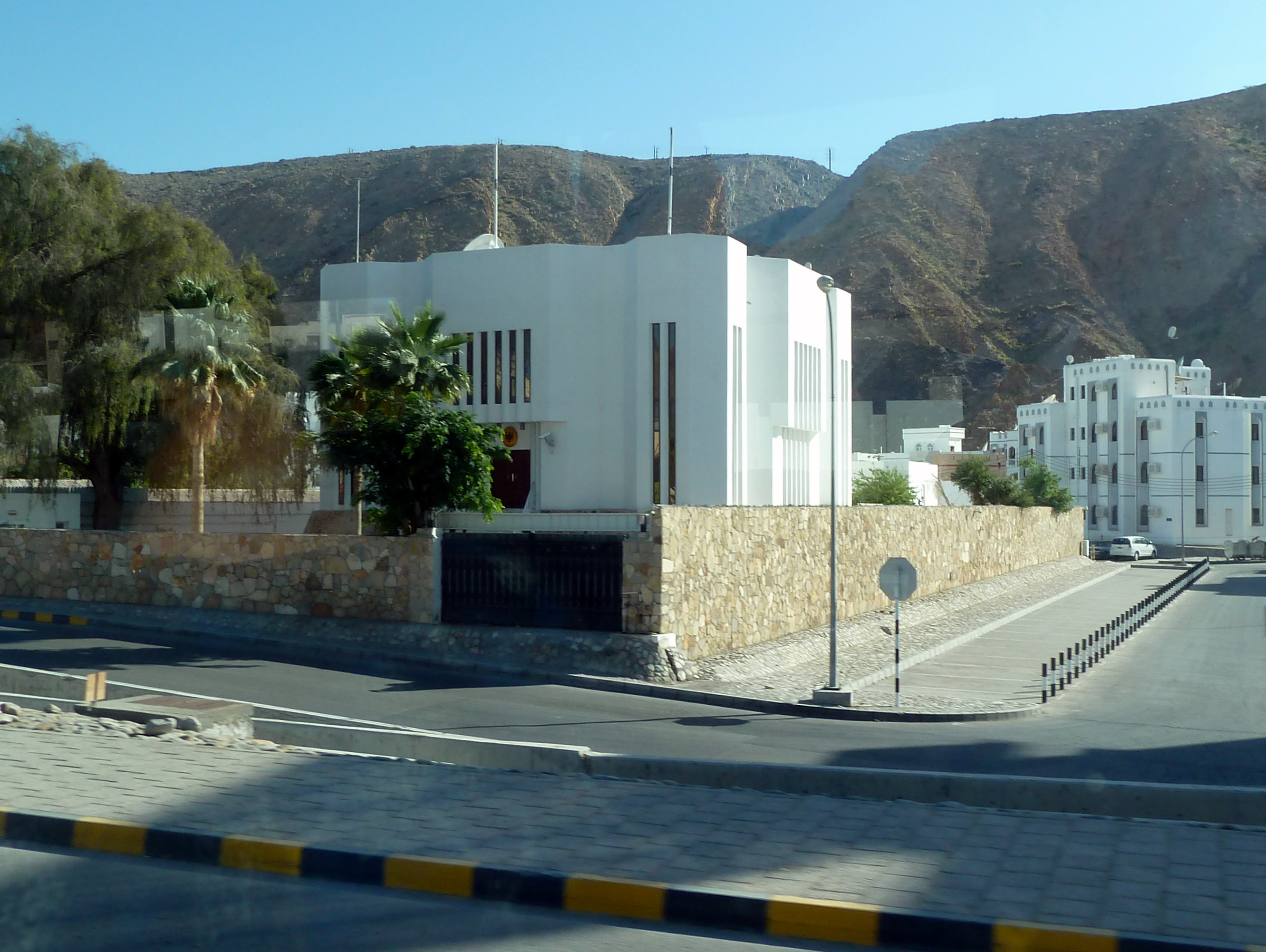
Embassy in Muscat

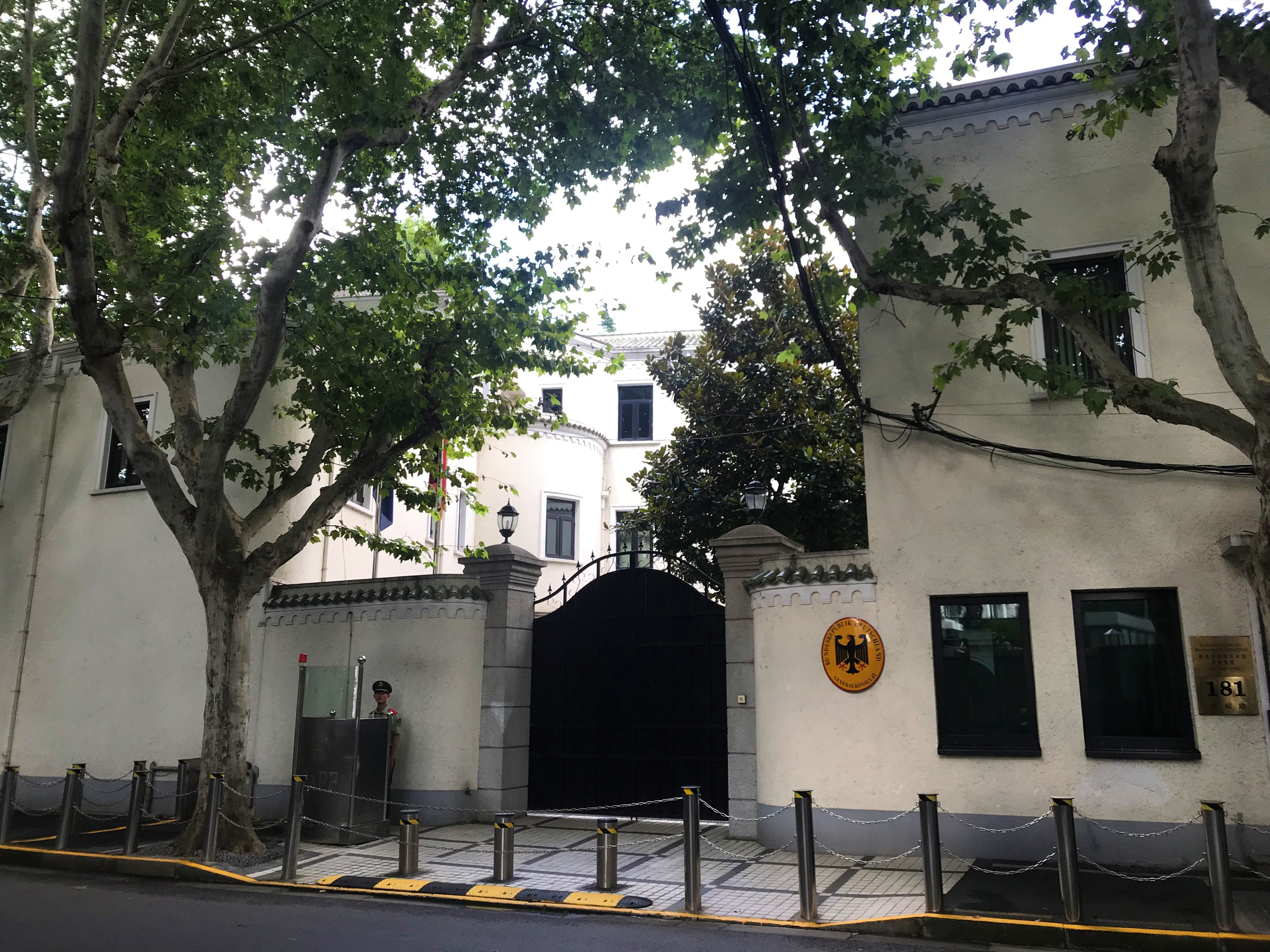
Consulate-General in Shanghai

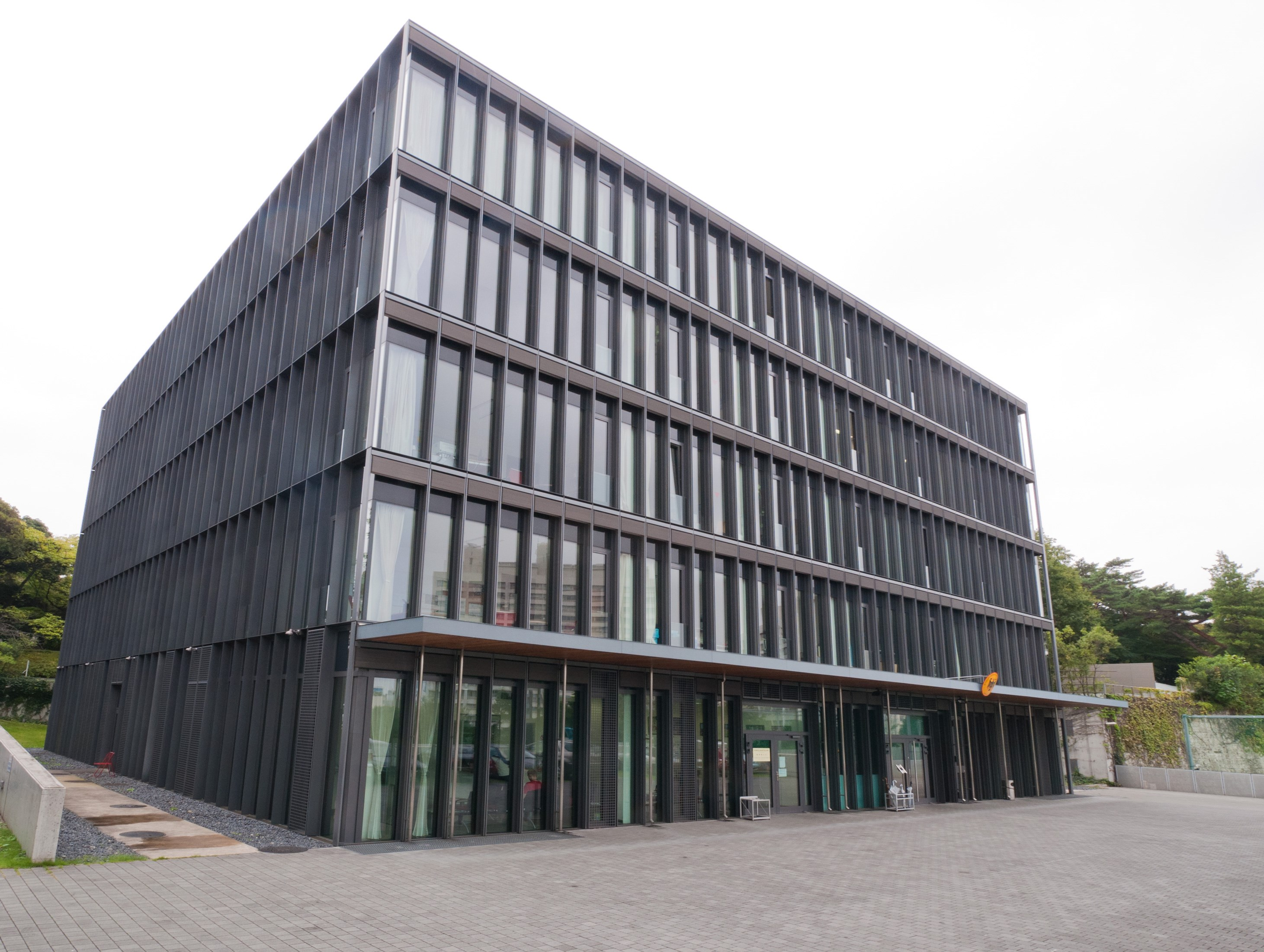
Embassy in Tokyo

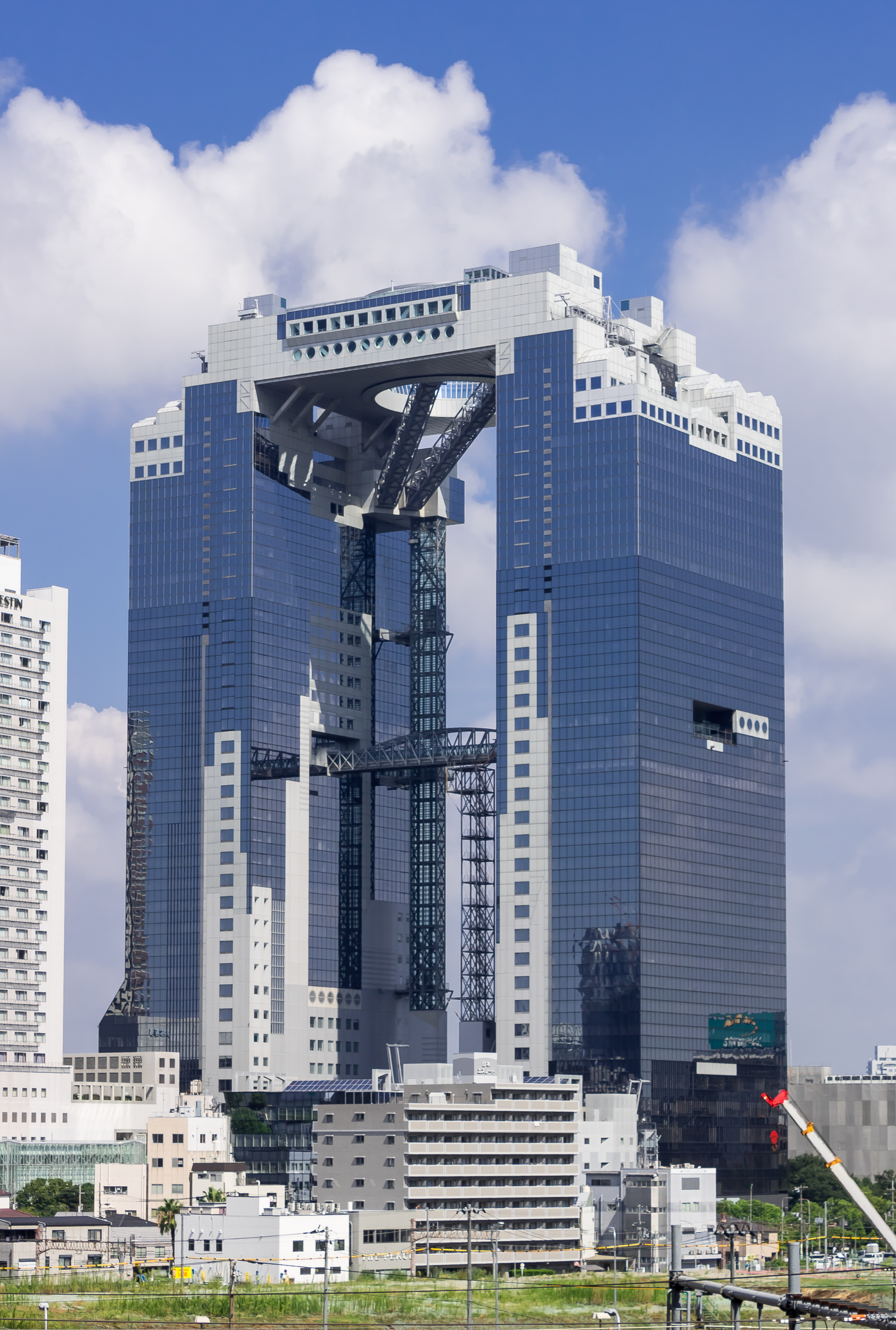
Building hosting the consulate-general in Osaka

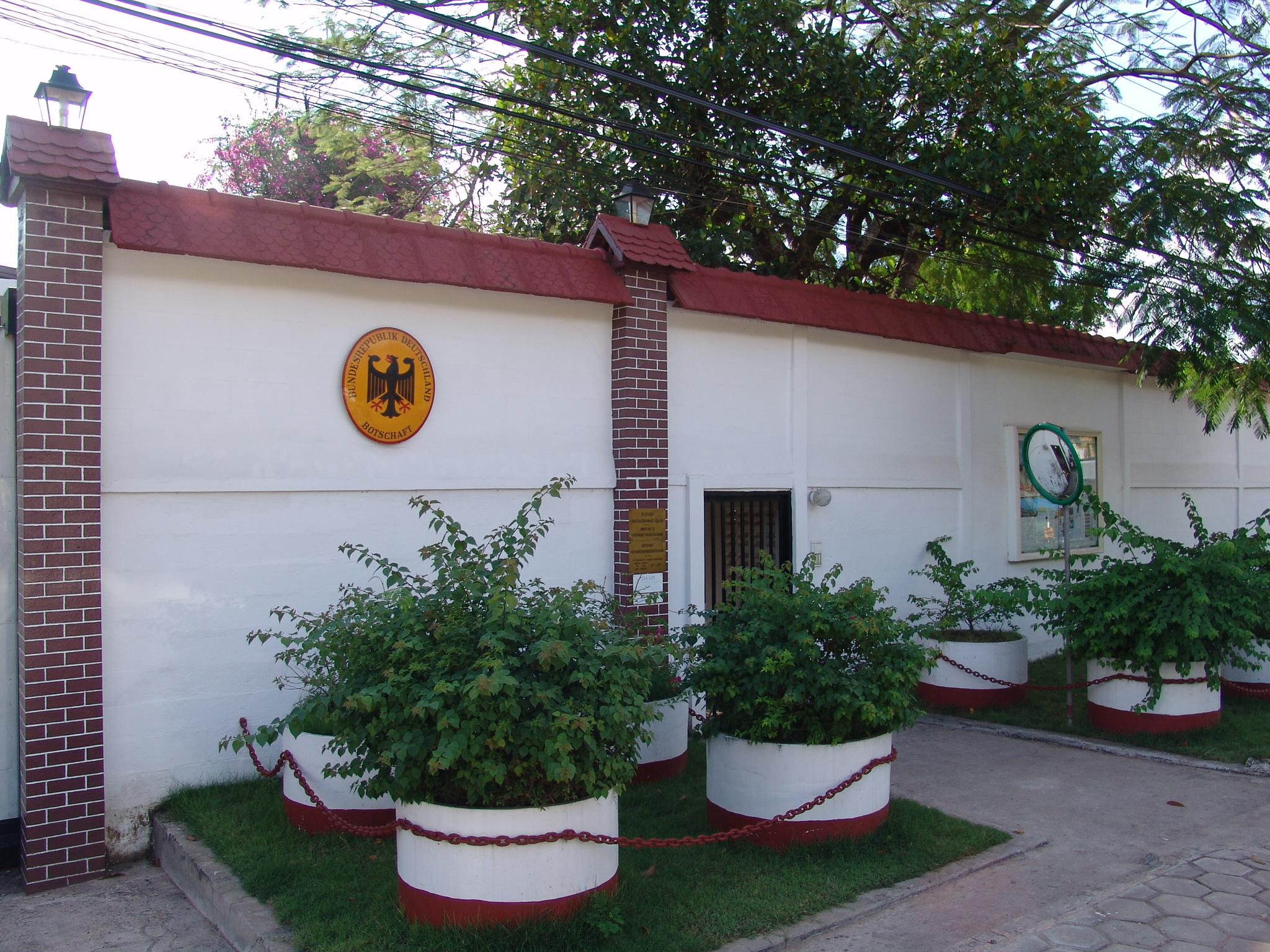
Embassy in Vientiane

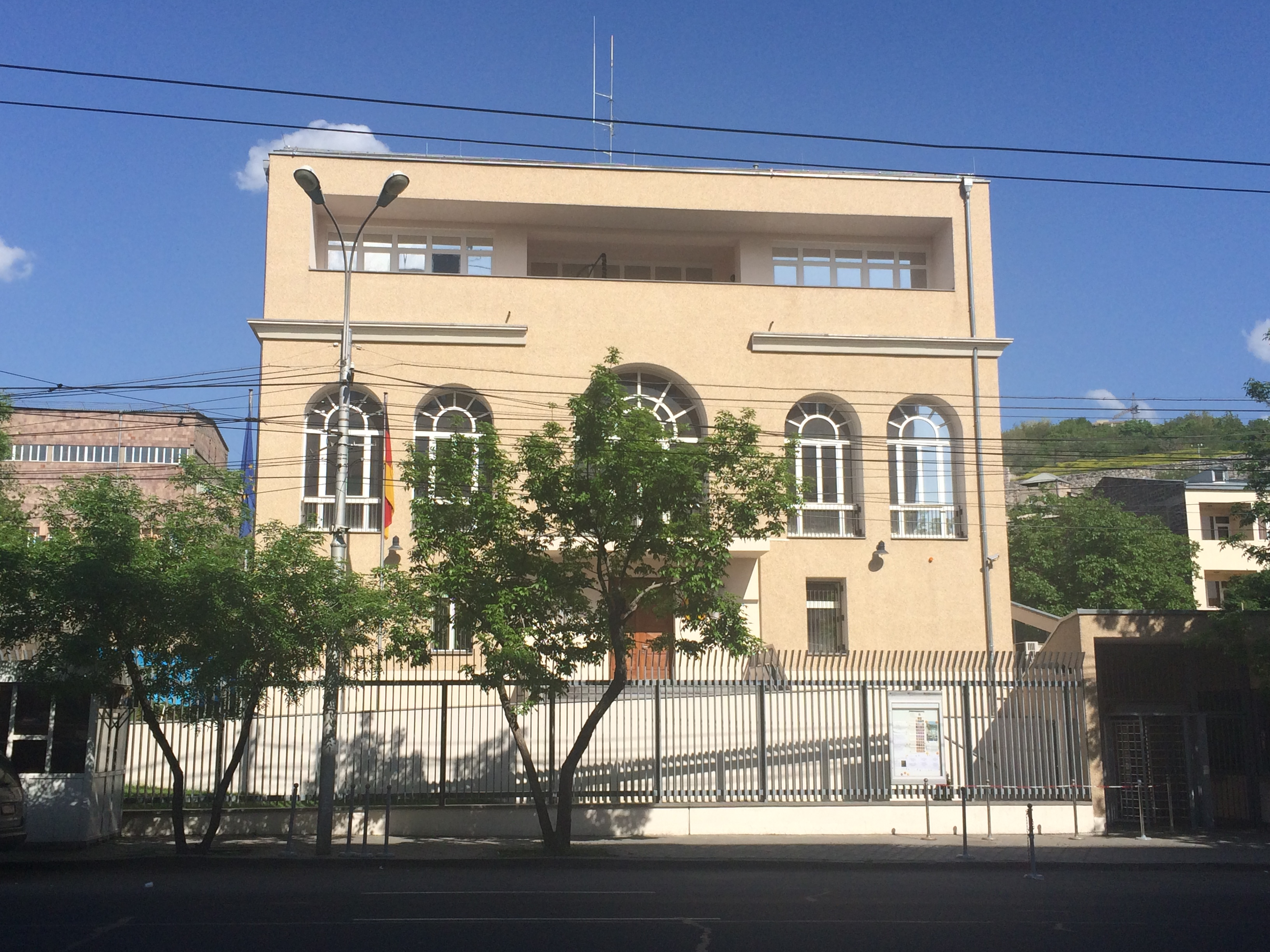
Embassy in Yerevan

=== Europe ===
Host country	Host city	Mission	Concurrent accreditation	Ref.
Albania	Tirana	Embassy		
Austria	Vienna	Embassy		
Belarus	Minsk	Embassy		
Belgium	Brussels	Embassy		
Bosnia and Herzegovina	Sarajevo	Embassy		
Bulgaria	Sofia	Embassy		
Croatia	Zagreb	Embassy		
Cyprus	Nicosia	Embassy		
Czech Republic	Prague	Embassy		
Denmark	Copenhagen	Embassy		
Estonia	Tallinn	Embassy		
Finland	Helsinki	Embassy		
France	Paris	Embassy	Countries: Monaco	
France	Bordeaux	Consulate-General	Countries: Monaco	
France	Lyon	Consulate-General	Countries: Monaco	
France	Marseille	Consulate-General	Countries: Monaco	
France	Strasbourg	Consulate-General	Countries: Monaco	
Greece	Athens	Embassy		
Greece	Thessaloniki	Consulate-General		
Holy See	Rome (Note: The German Embassy to the Holy See is located outside Vatican territory in Rome.)	Embassy	Sovereign Entity: Sovereign Military Order of Malta	
Hungary	Budapest	Embassy		
Iceland	Reykjavík	Embassy		
Ireland	Dublin	Embassy		
Italy	Rome	Embassy	Countries: San Marino	
Italy	Milan	Consulate-General	Countries: San Marino	
Kosovo	Pristina	Embassy		
Latvia	Riga	Embassy		
Lithuania	Vilnius	Embassy		
Luxembourg	Luxembourg City	Embassy		
Malta	Valletta	Embassy		
Moldova	Chişinău	Embassy		
Montenegro	Podgorica	Embassy		
Netherlands	The Hague	Embassy		
Netherlands	Amsterdam	Consulate-General		
North Cyprus	North Nicosia	Embassy Office		
North Macedonia	Skopje	Embassy		
Norway	Oslo	Embassy		
Poland	Warsaw	Embassy		
Poland	Gdańsk	Consulate-General		
Poland	Kraków	Consulate-General		
Poland	Wrocław	Consulate-General		
Poland	Opole	Consulate		
Portugal	Lisbon	Embassy	Countries: Cape Verde	
Romania	Bucharest	Embassy		
Romania	Sibiu	Consulate		
Romania	Timișoara	Consulate		
Russia	Moscow	Embassy		
Serbia	Belgrade	Embassy		
Slovakia	Bratislava	Embassy		
Slovenia	Ljubljana	Embassy		
Spain	Madrid	Embassy	Countries: Andorra	
Spain	Barcelona	Consulate-General	Countries: Andorra	
Spain	Las Palmas de Gran Canaria	Consulate	Countries: Andorra	
Spain	Málaga	Consulate	Countries: Andorra	
Spain	Palma de Mallorca	Consulate	Countries: Andorra	
Sweden	Stockholm	Embassy		
Switzerland	Bern	Embassy	Countries: Liechtenstein	
Ukraine	Kyiv	Embassy		
United Kingdom	London	Embassy		
United Kingdom	Edinburgh	Consulate-General		

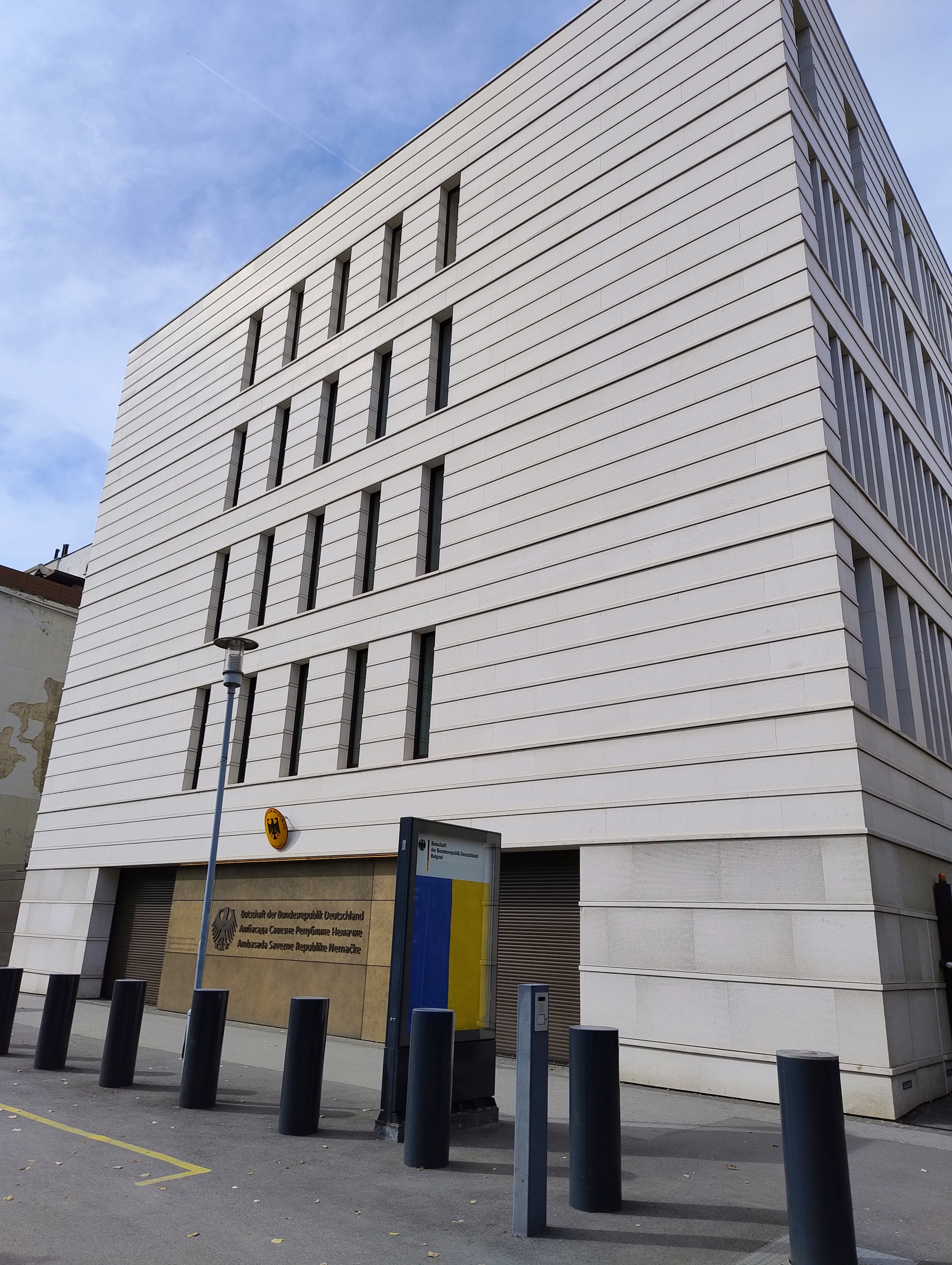
Embassy in Belgrade

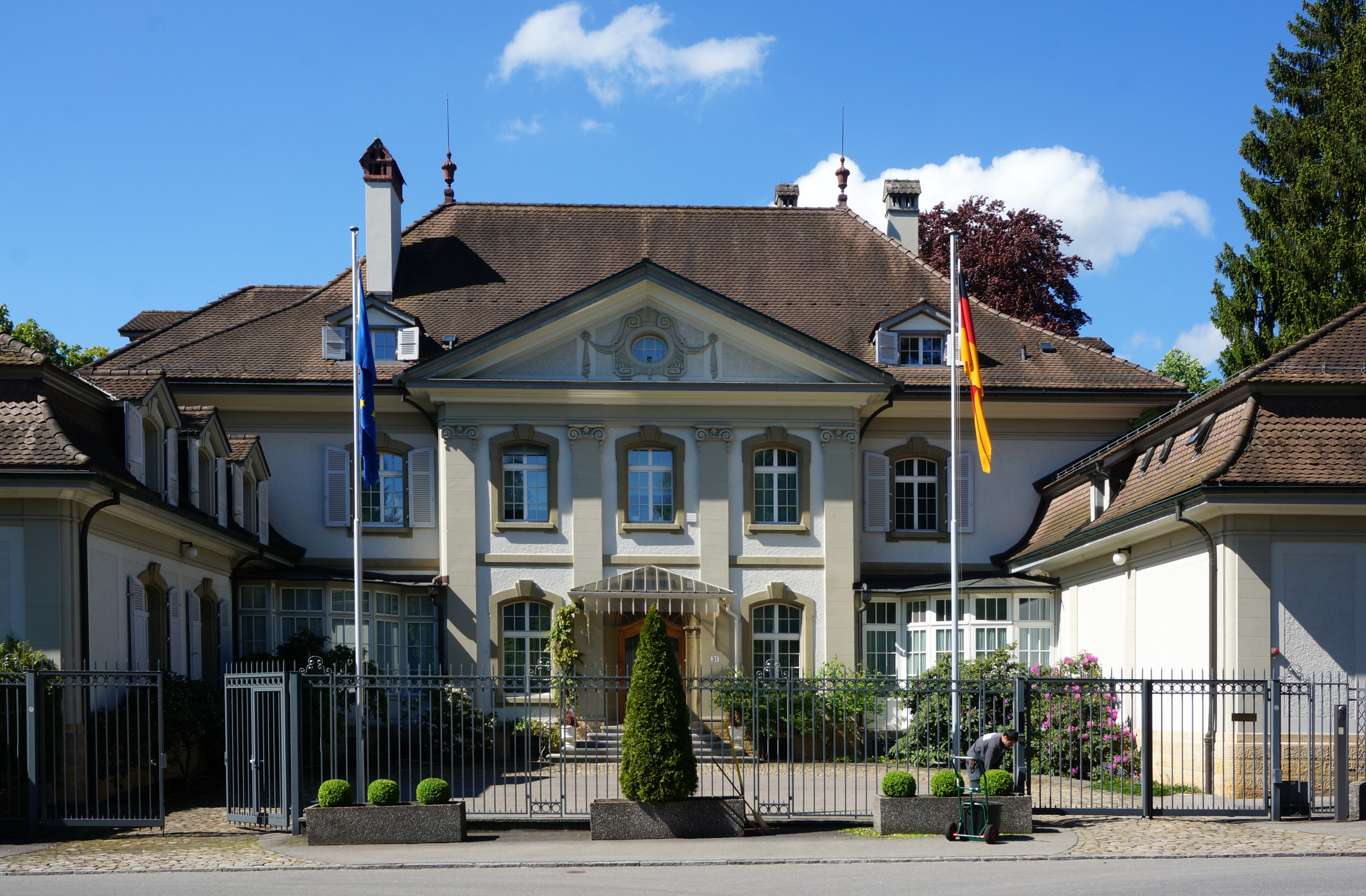
Embassy in Bern

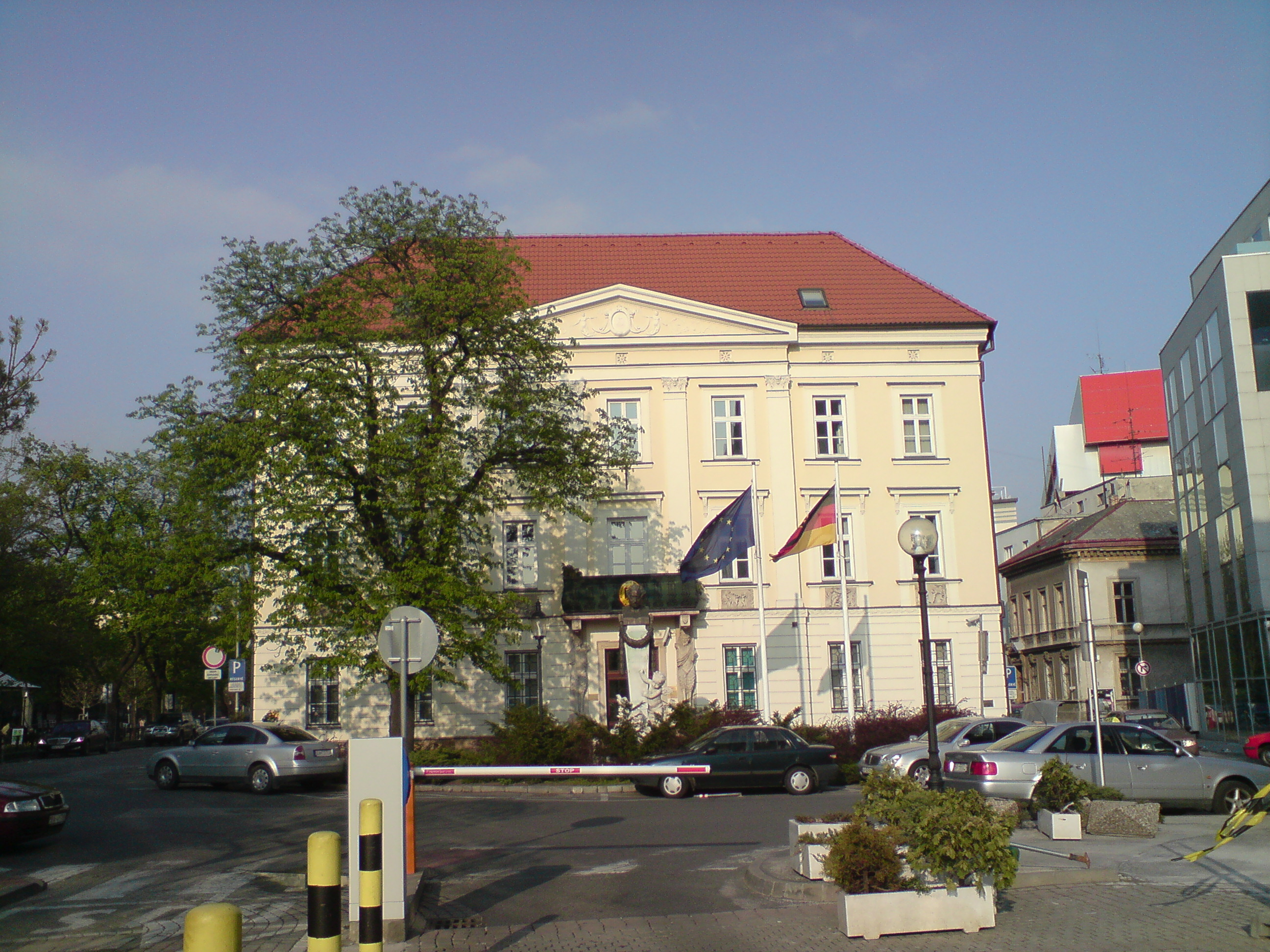
Embassy in Bratislava

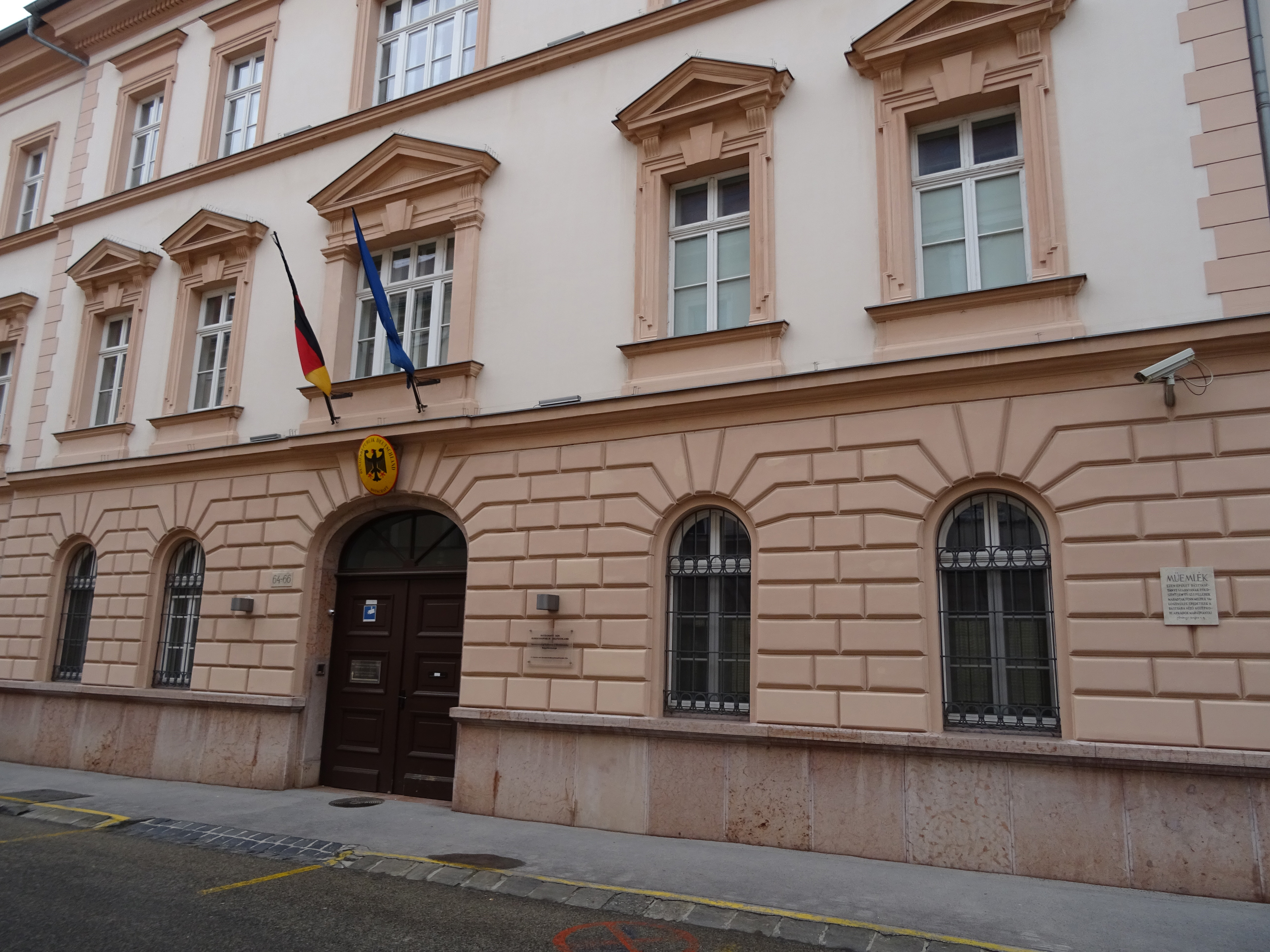
Embassy in Budapest

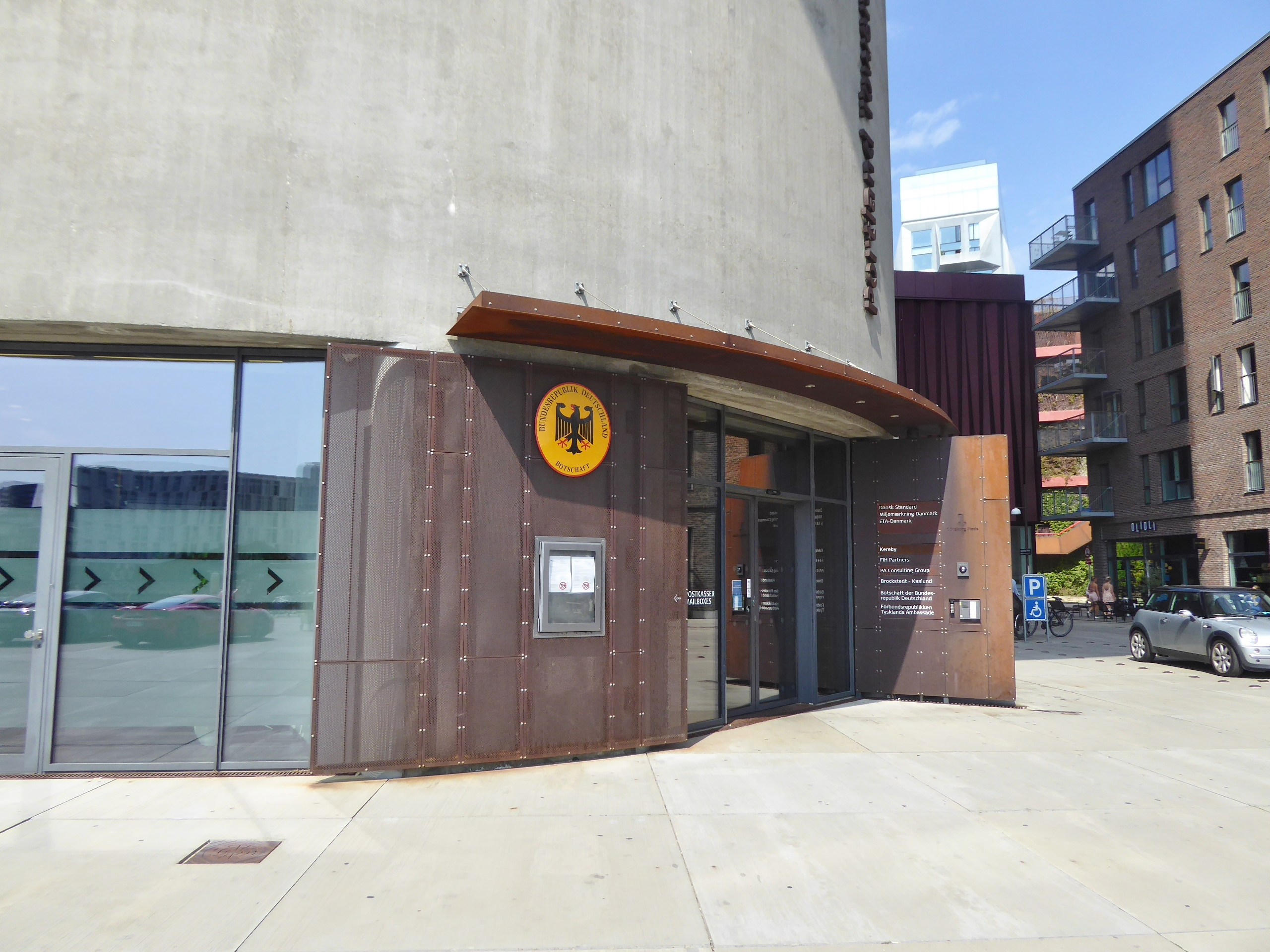
Embassy in Copenhagen

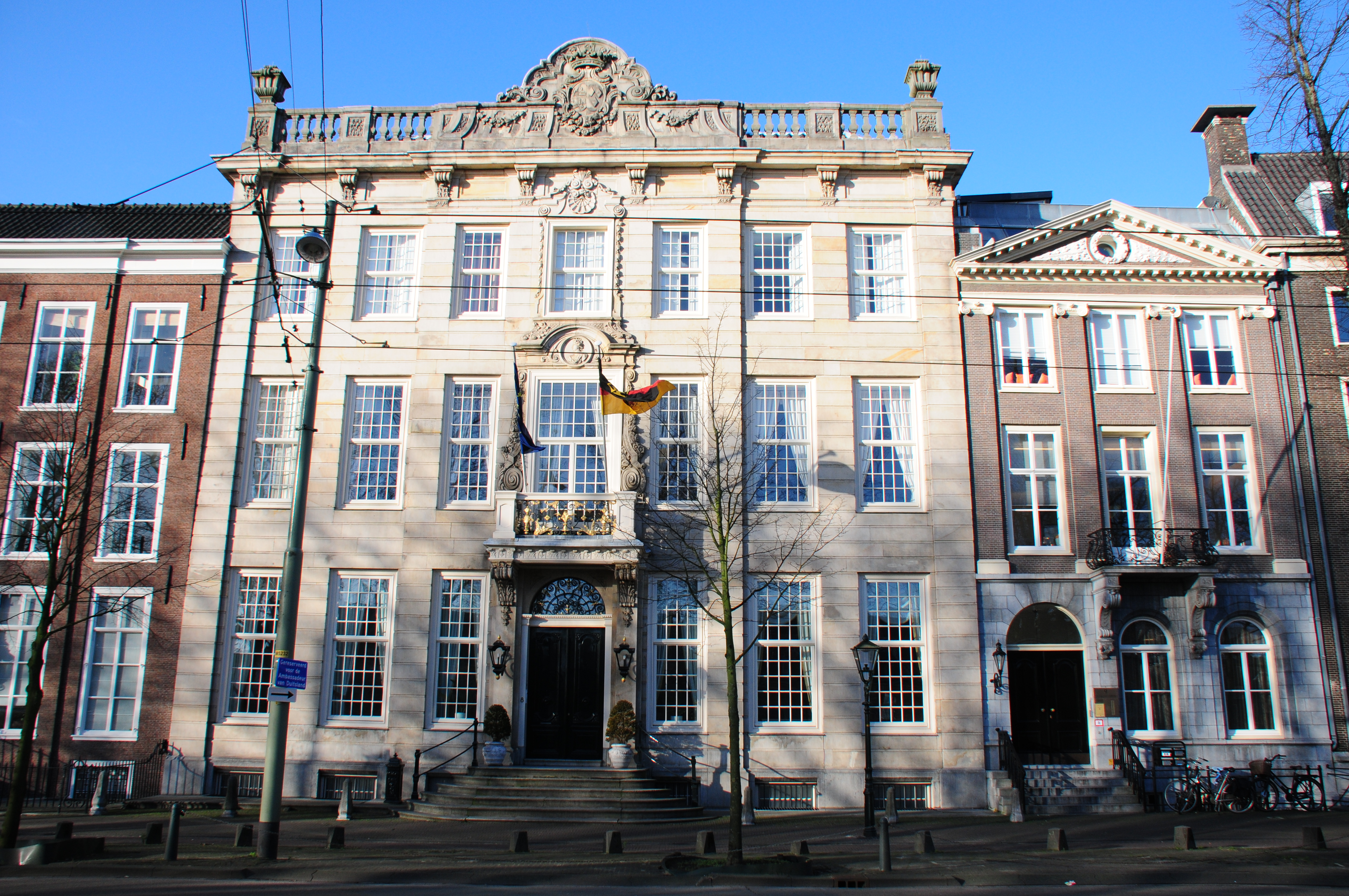
Embassy in The Hague

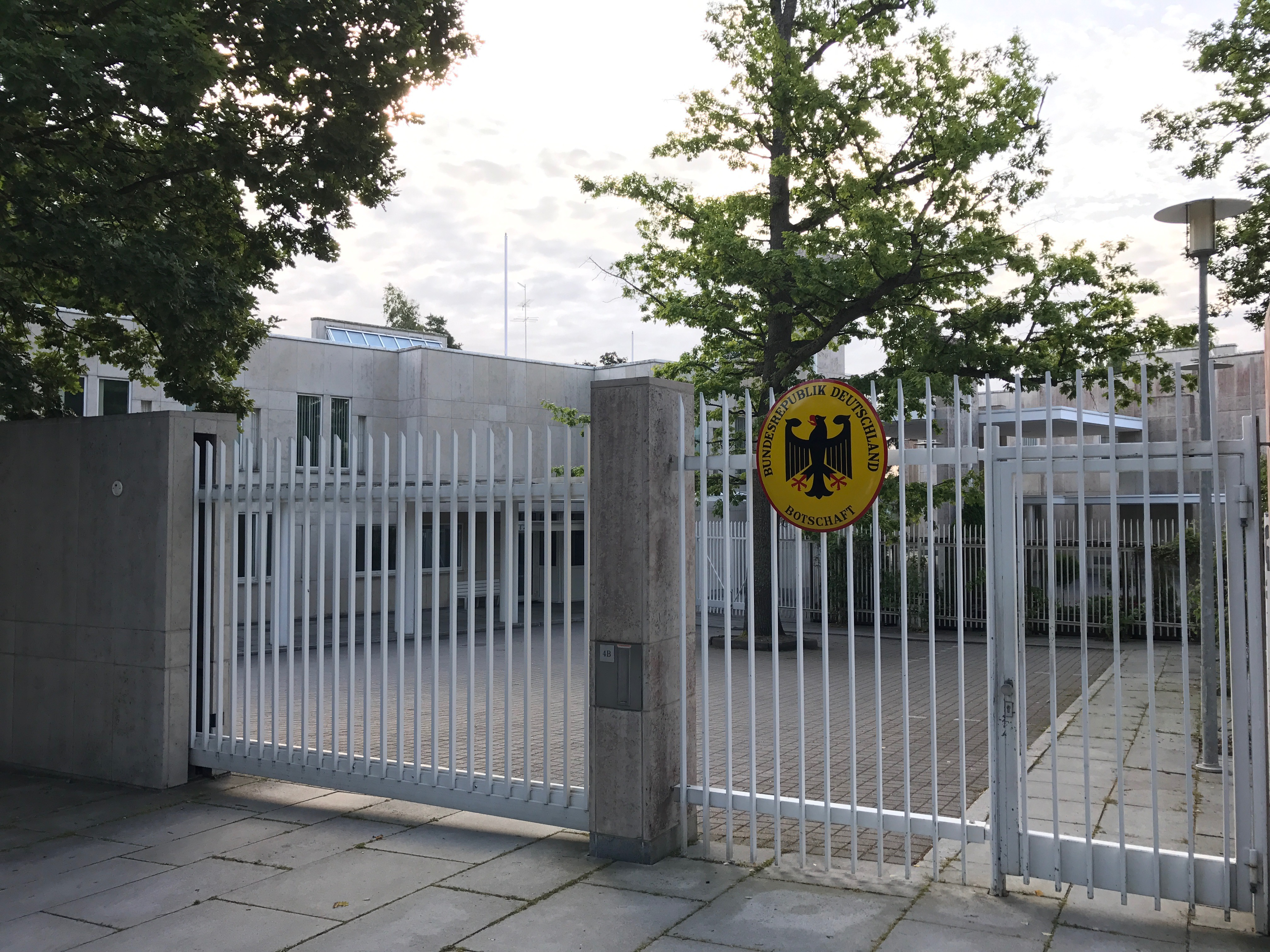
Embassy in Helsinki

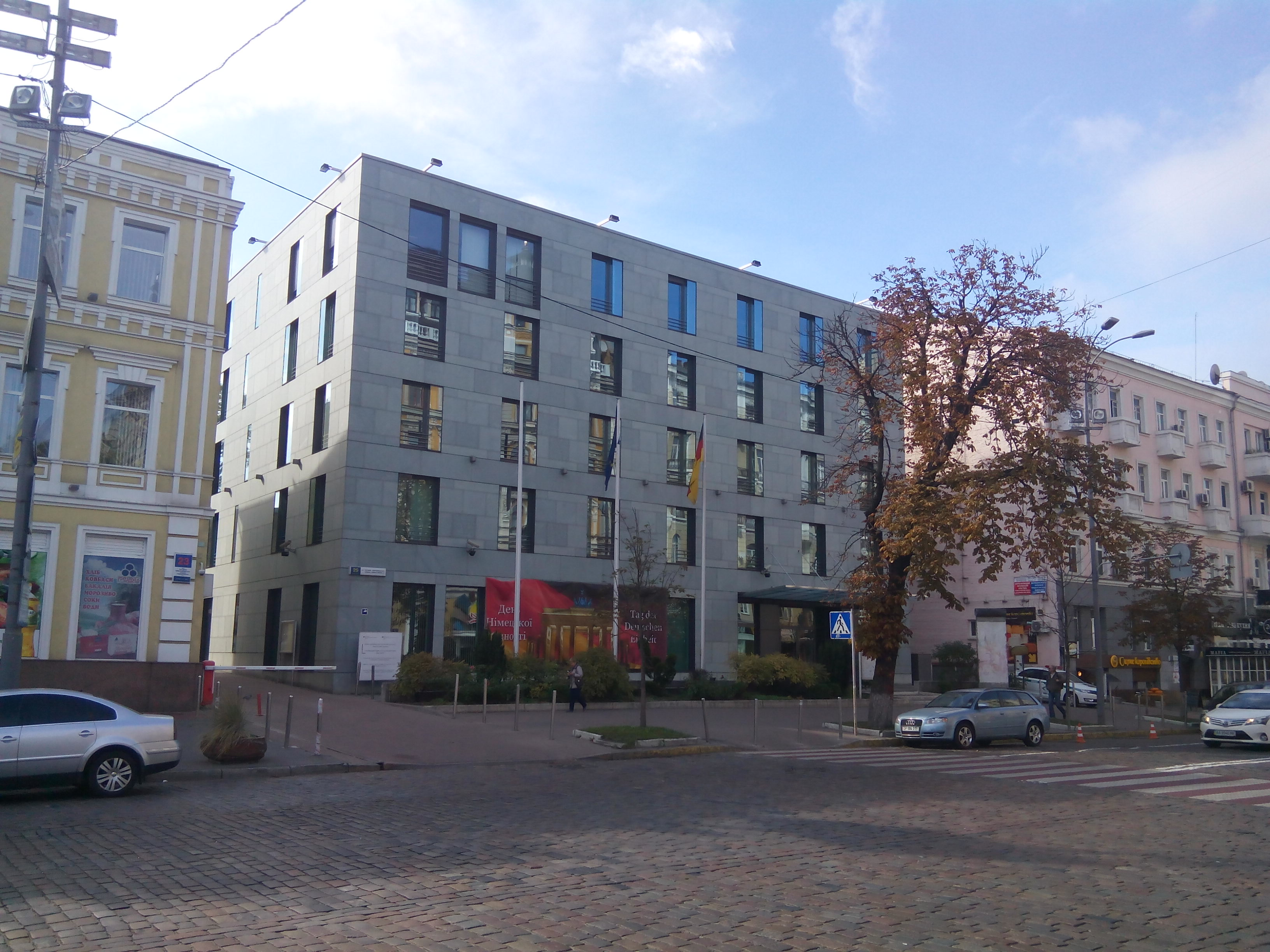
Embassy in Kyiv

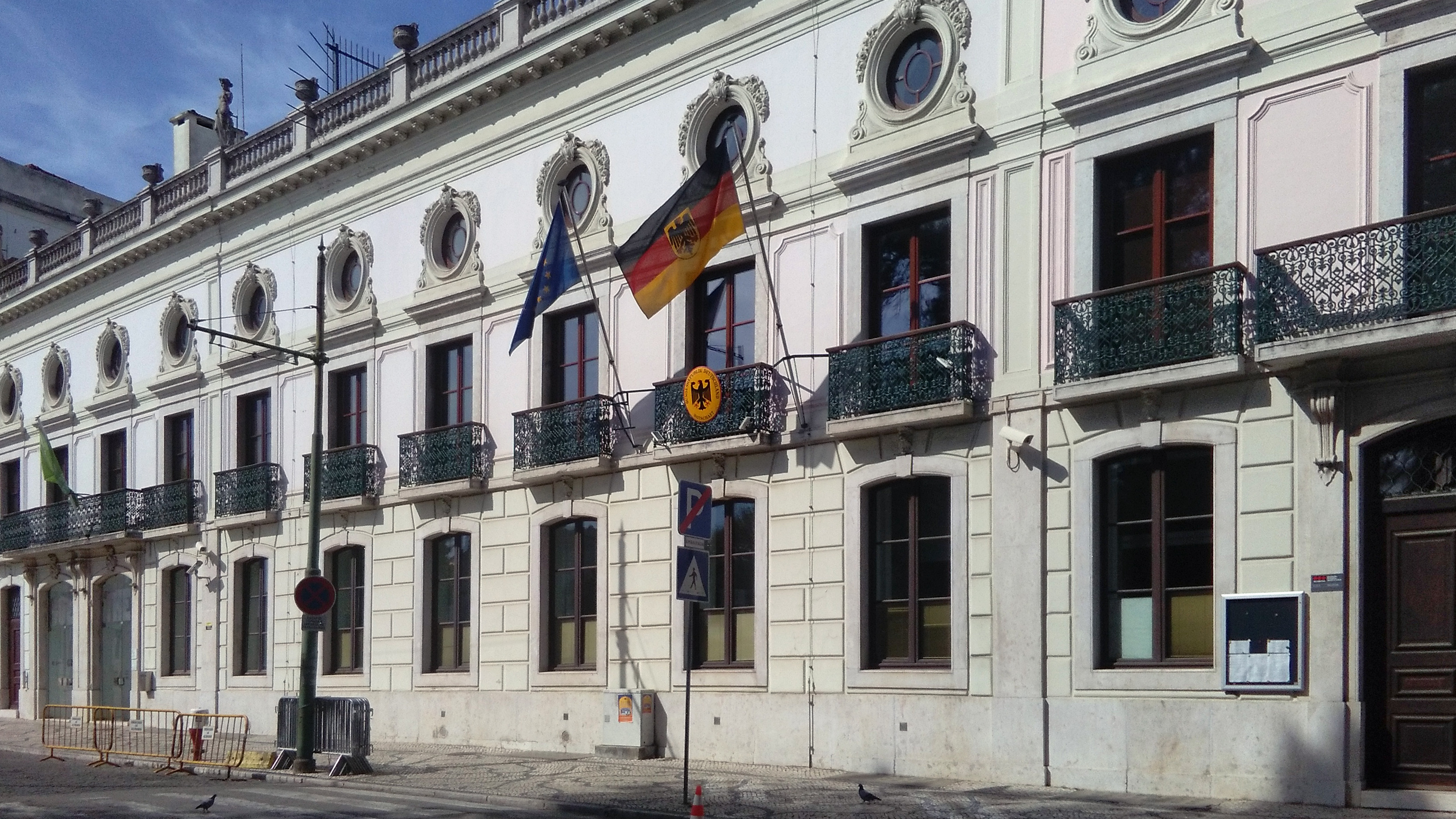
Embassy in Lisbon

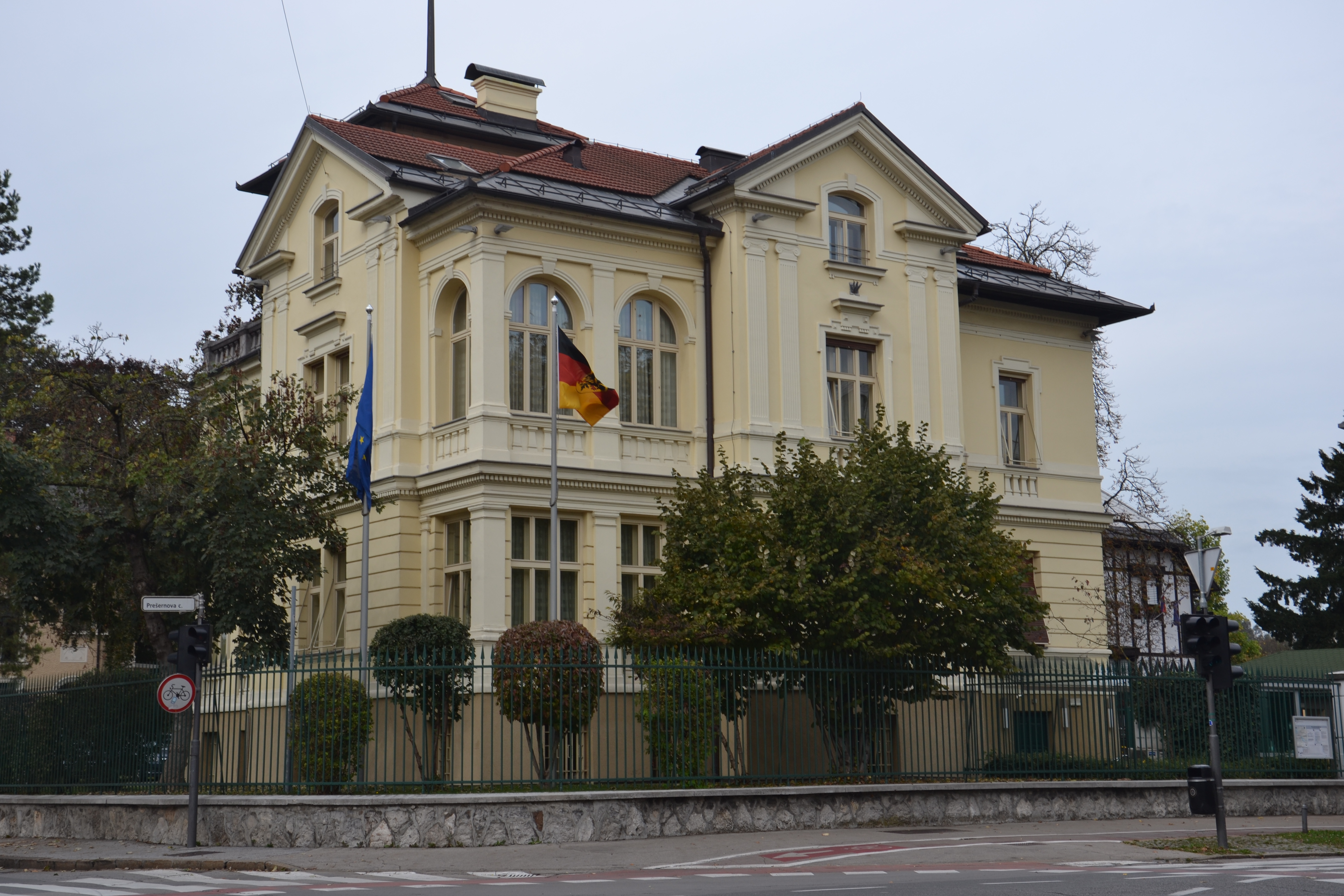
Embassy in Ljubljana

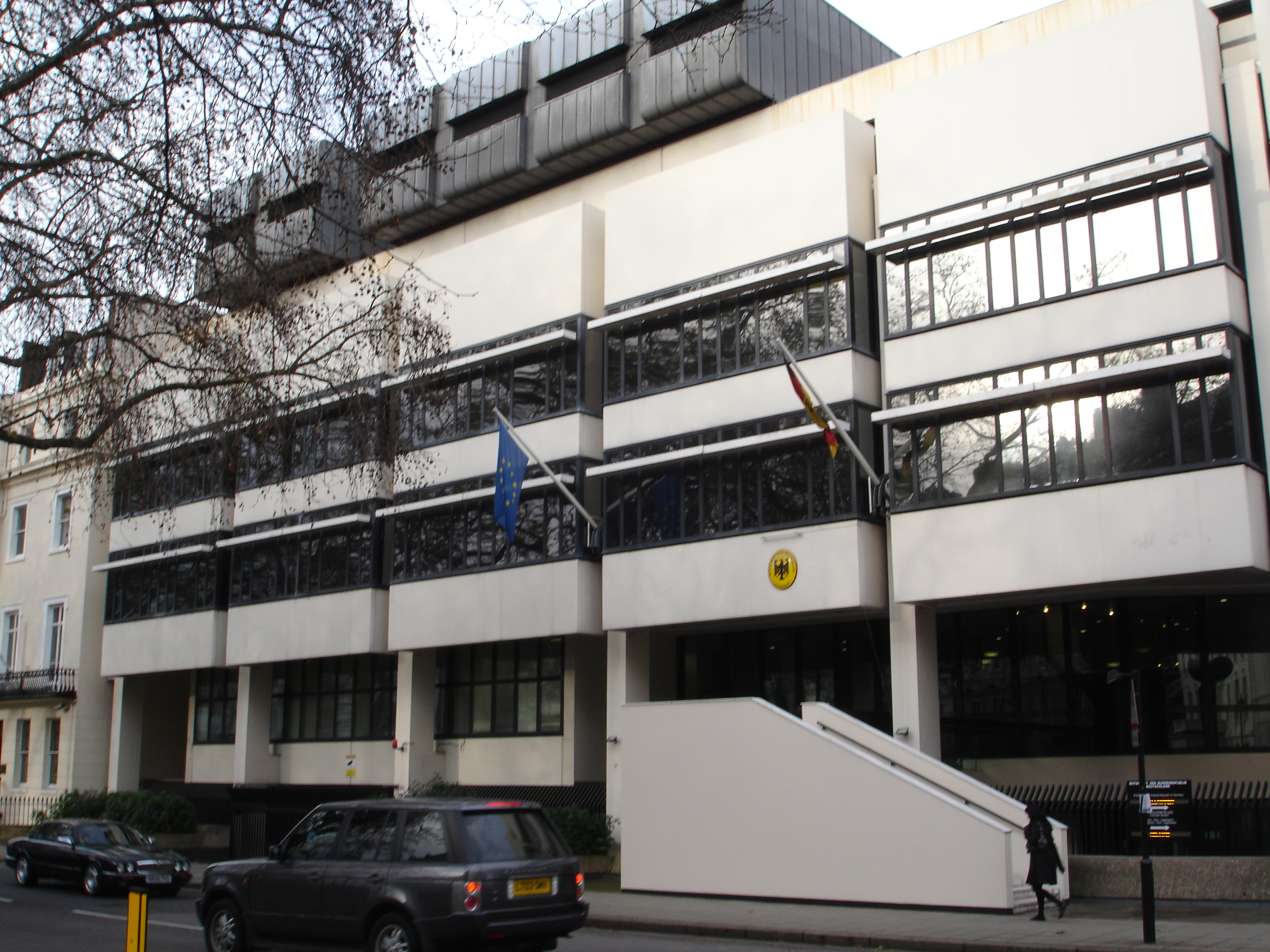
Embassy in London

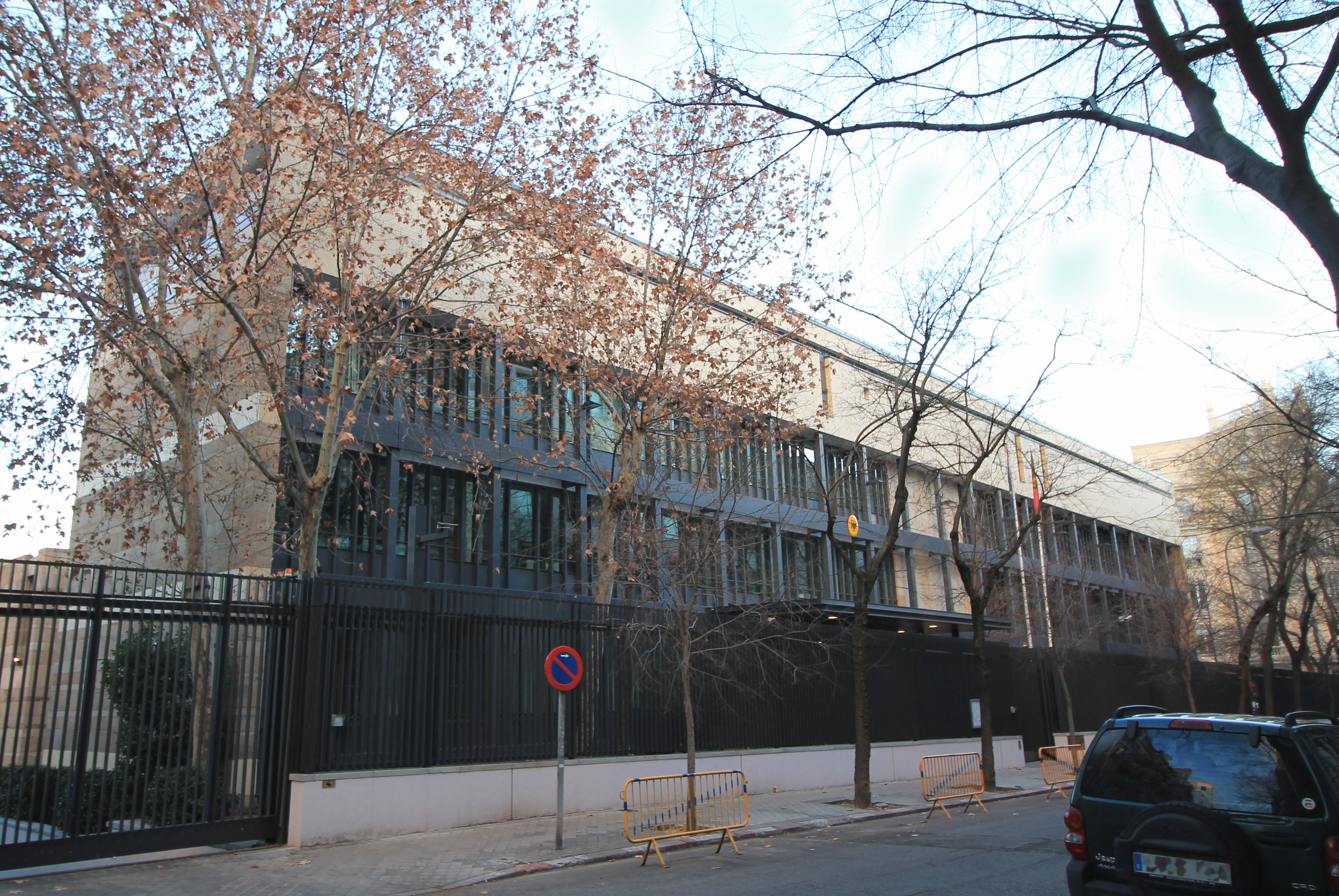
Embassy in Madrid

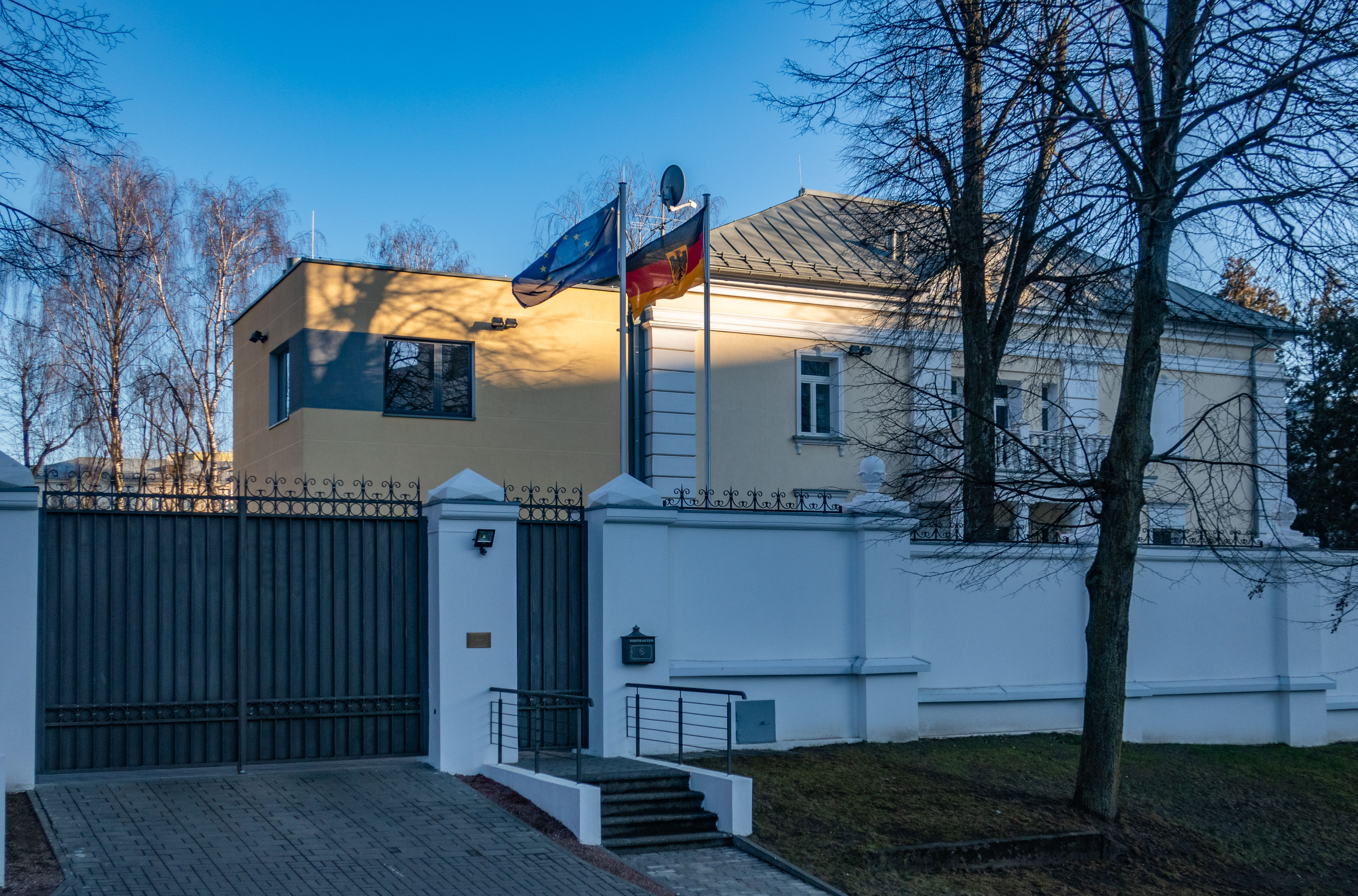
Embassy in Minsk

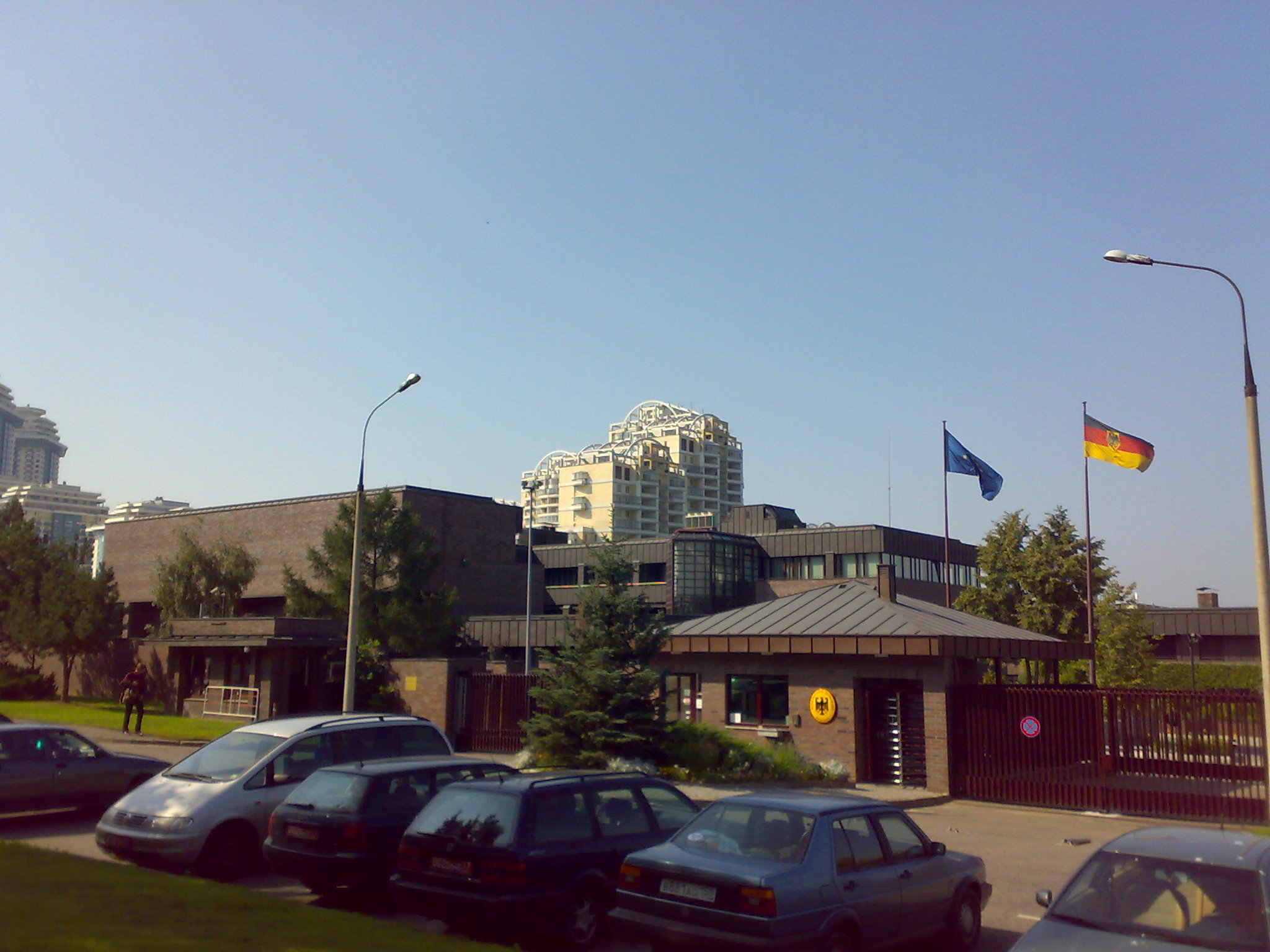
Embassy in Moscow

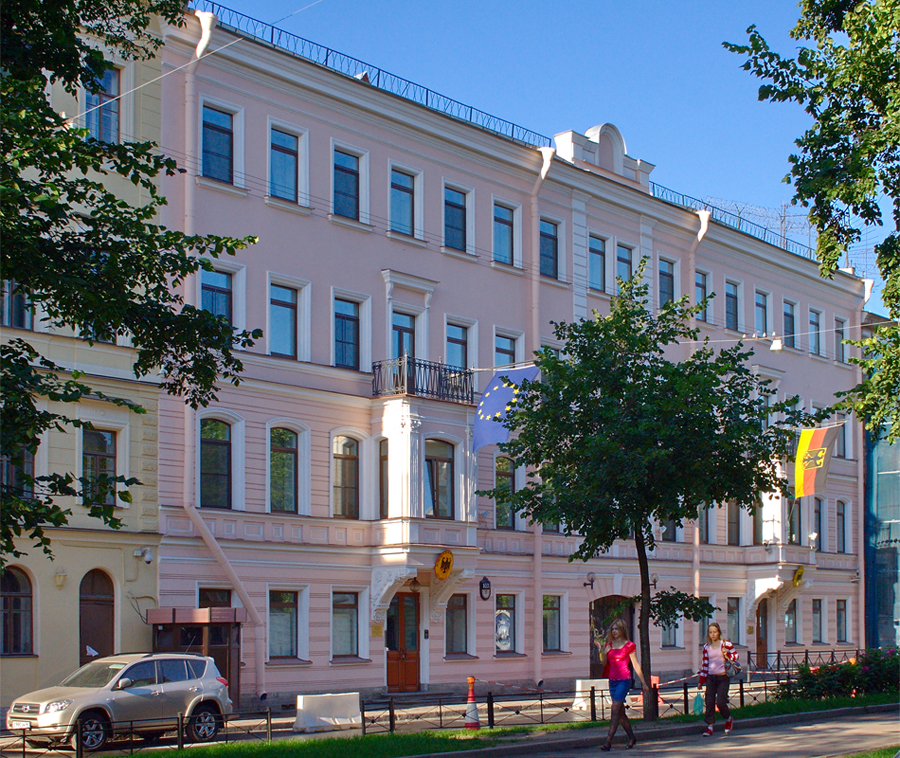
Consulate-General in Saint Petersburg

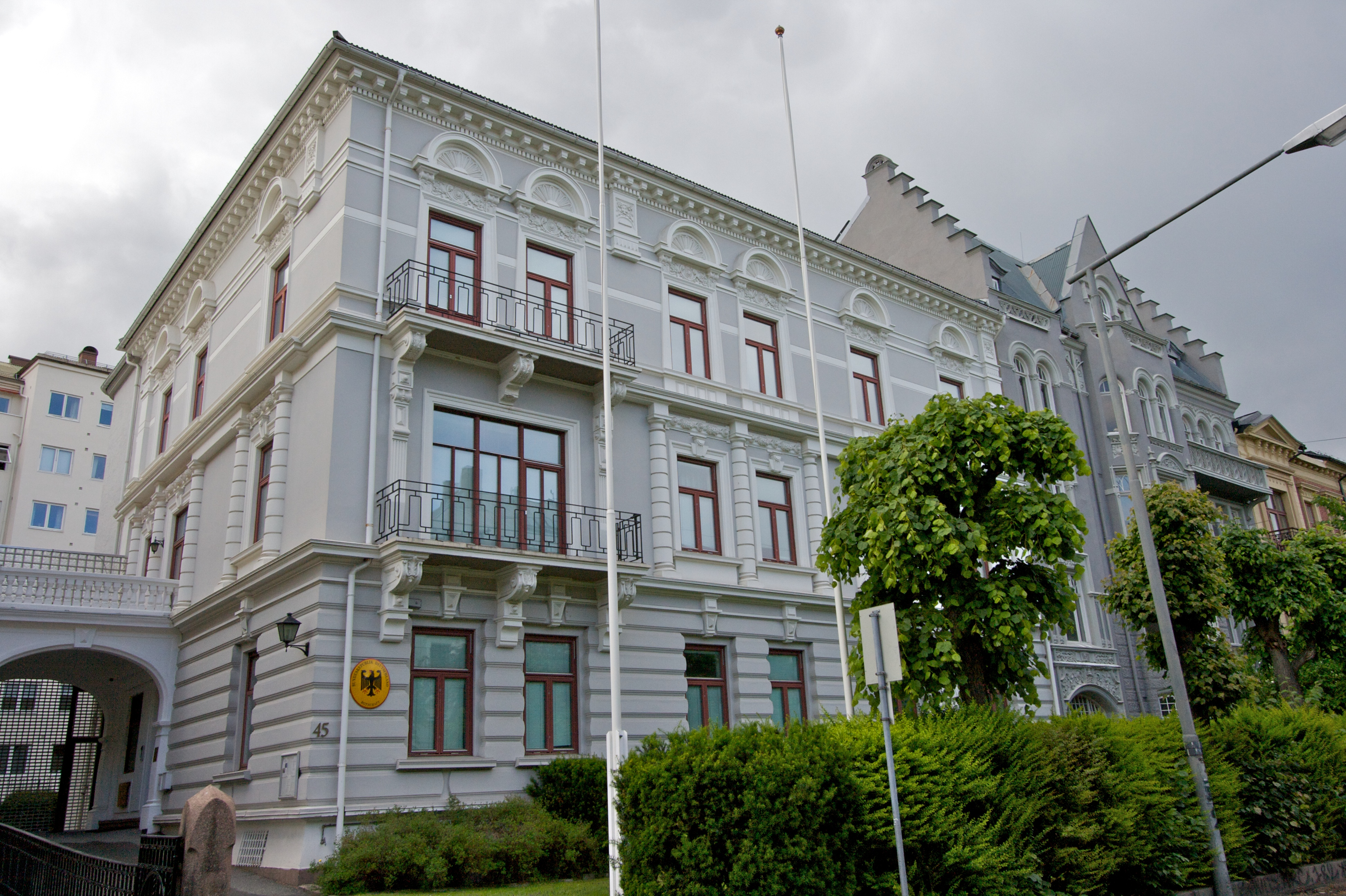
Embassy in Oslo

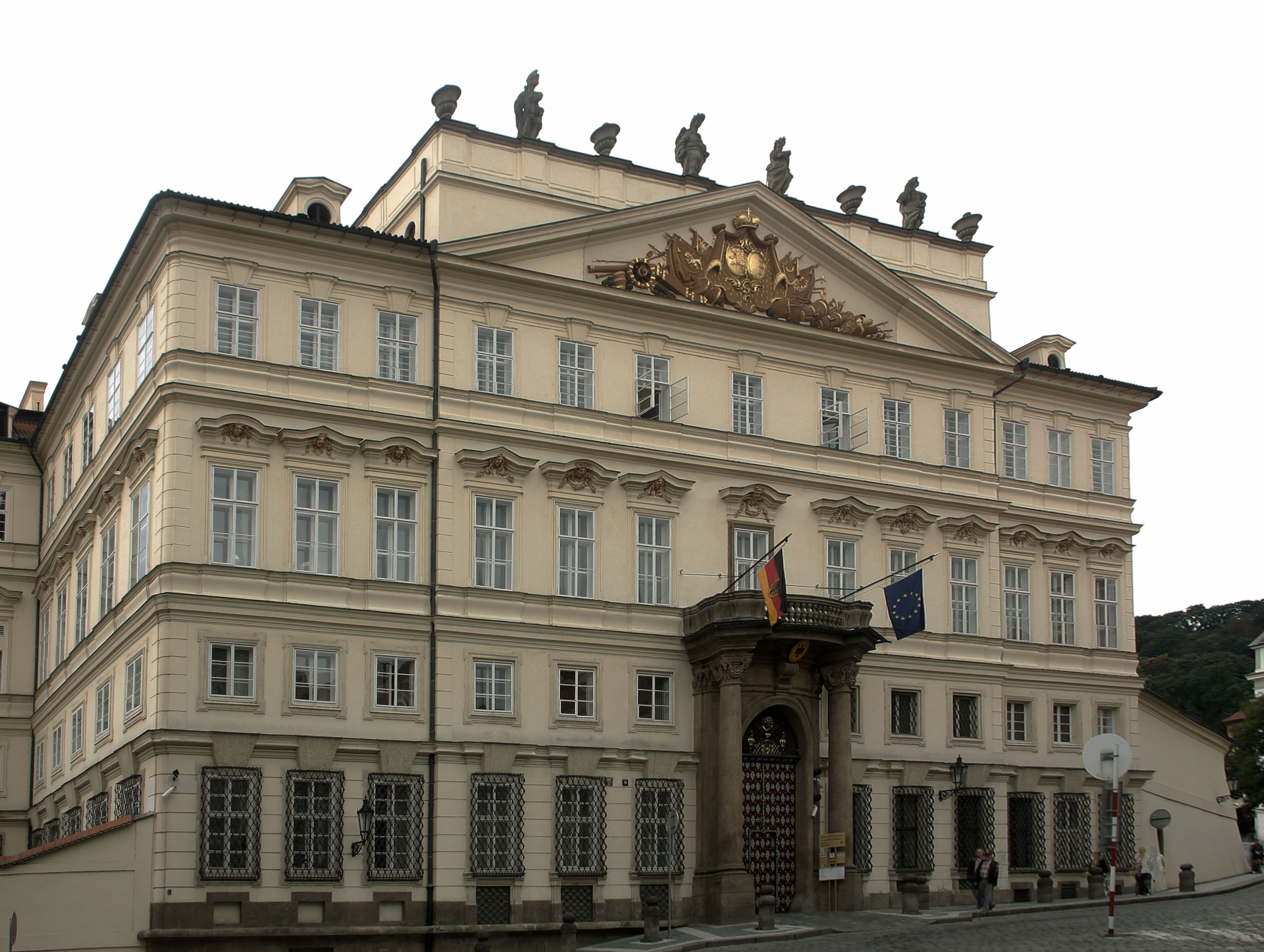
Embassy in Prague

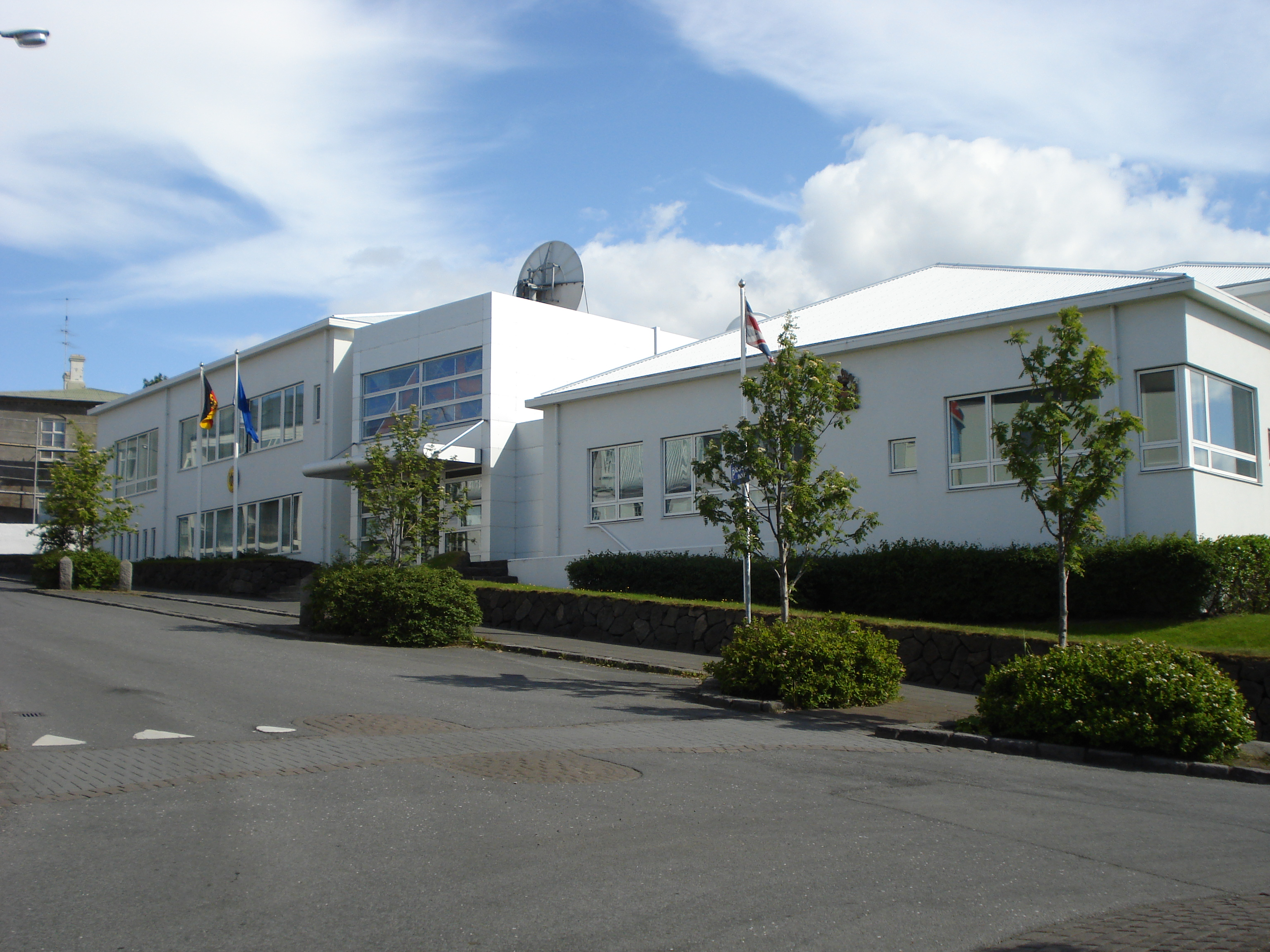
Embassy in Reykjavík

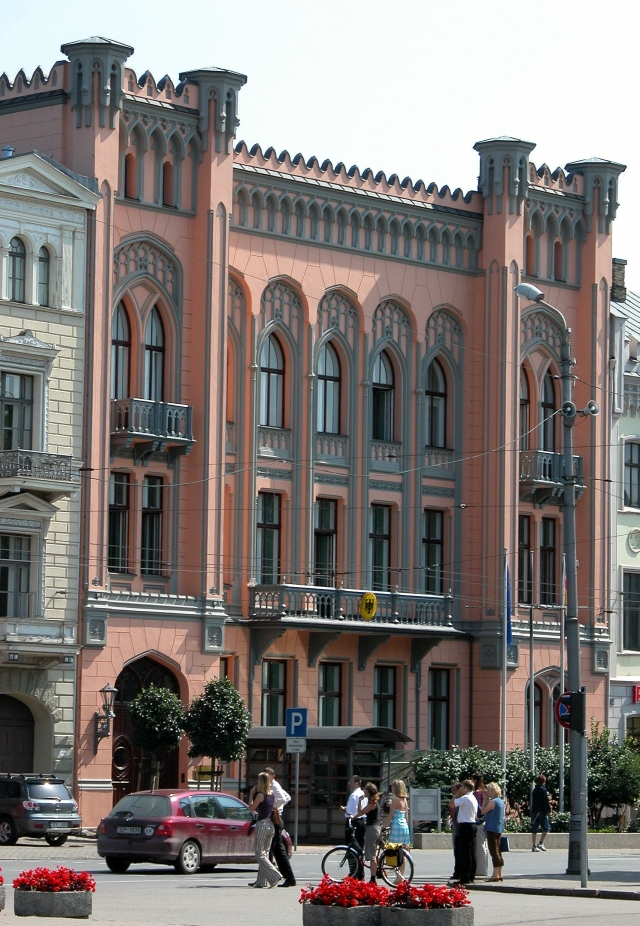
Embassy in Riga

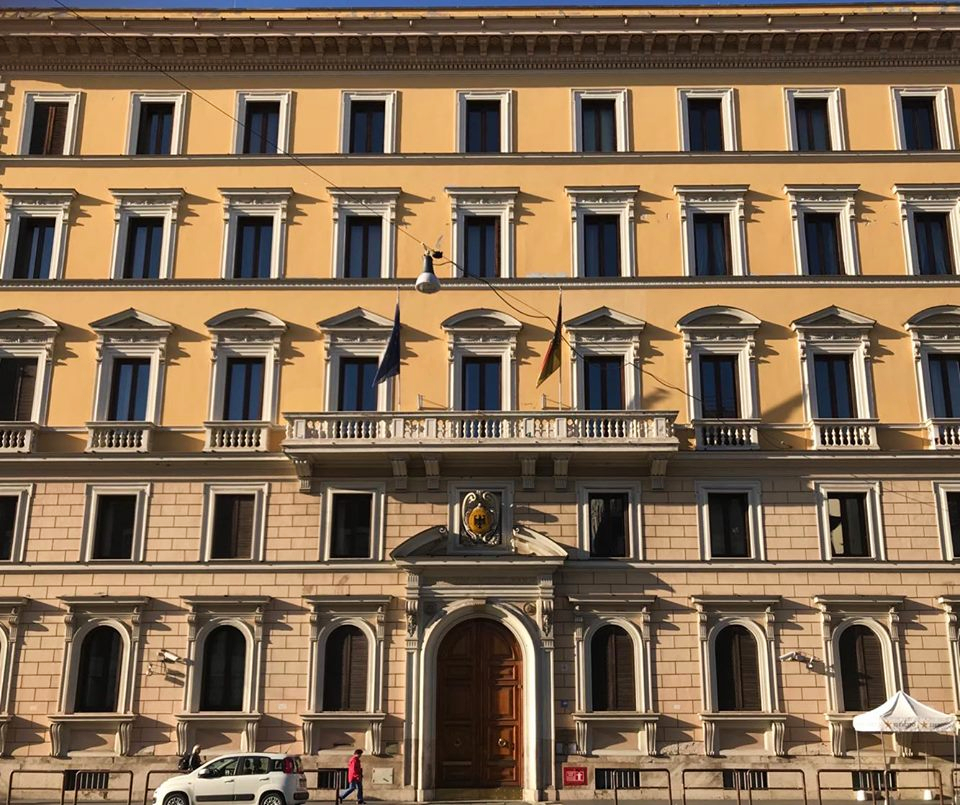
Embassy in Rome

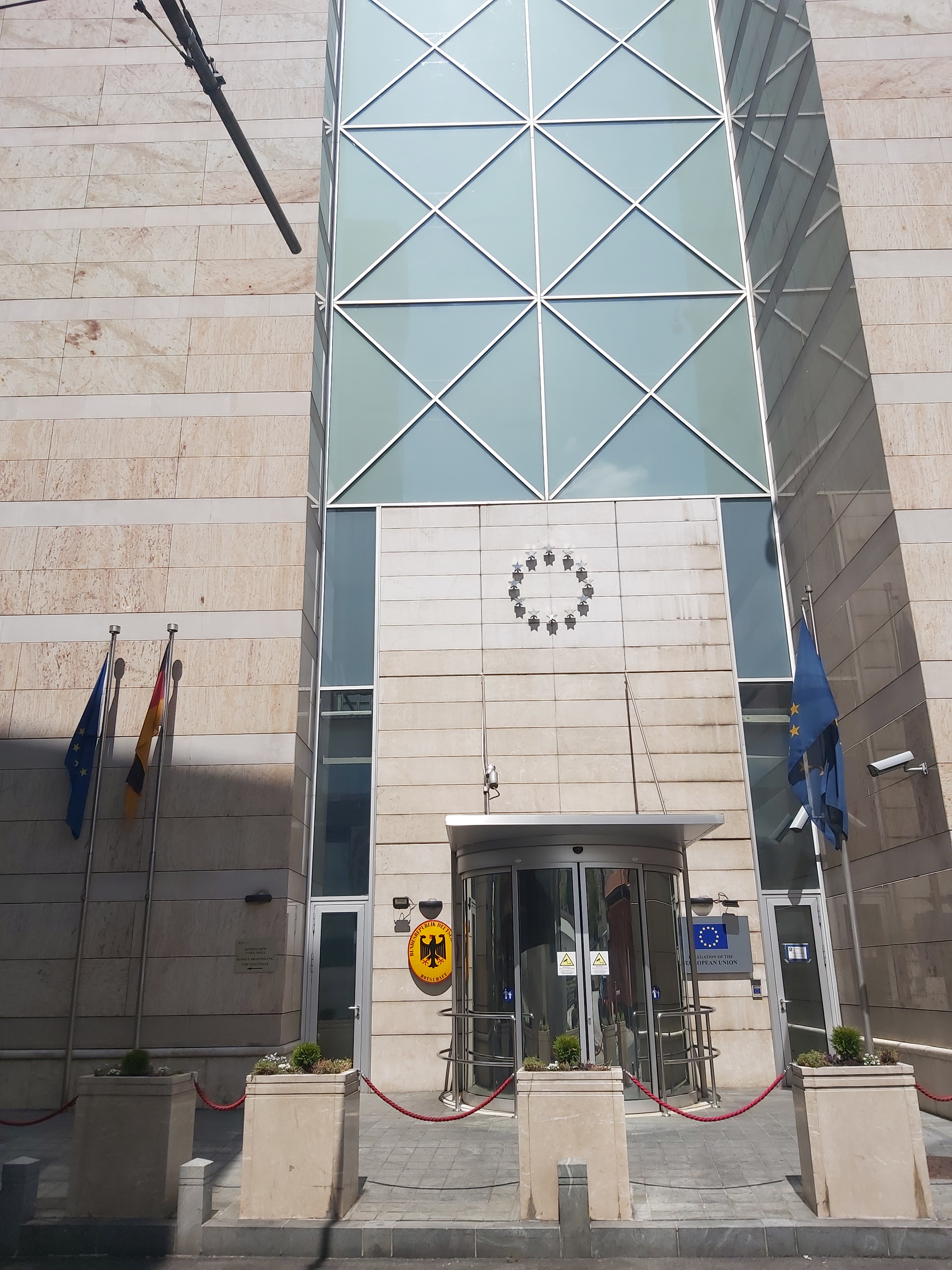
Embassy in Sarajevo

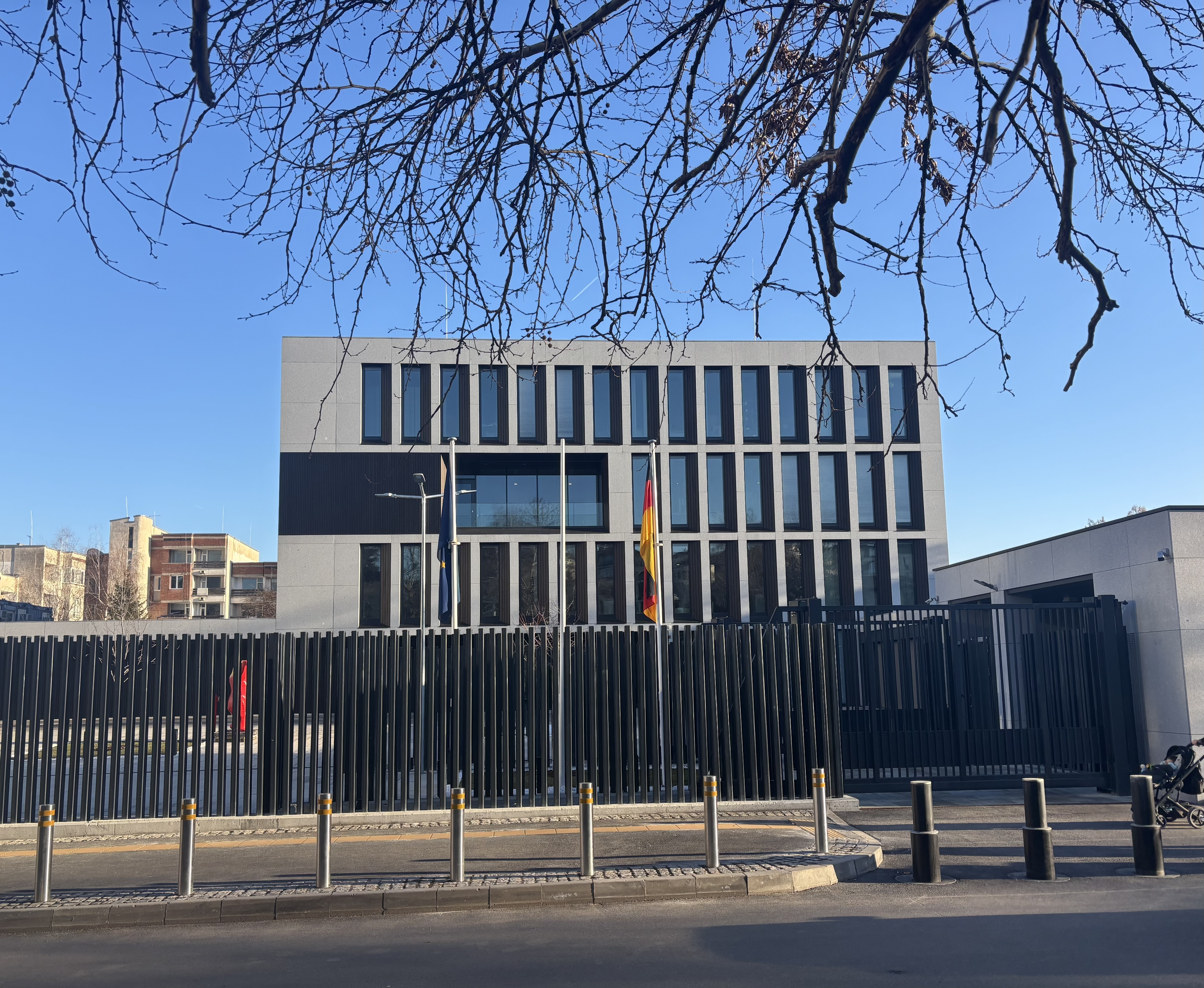
Embassy in Sofia

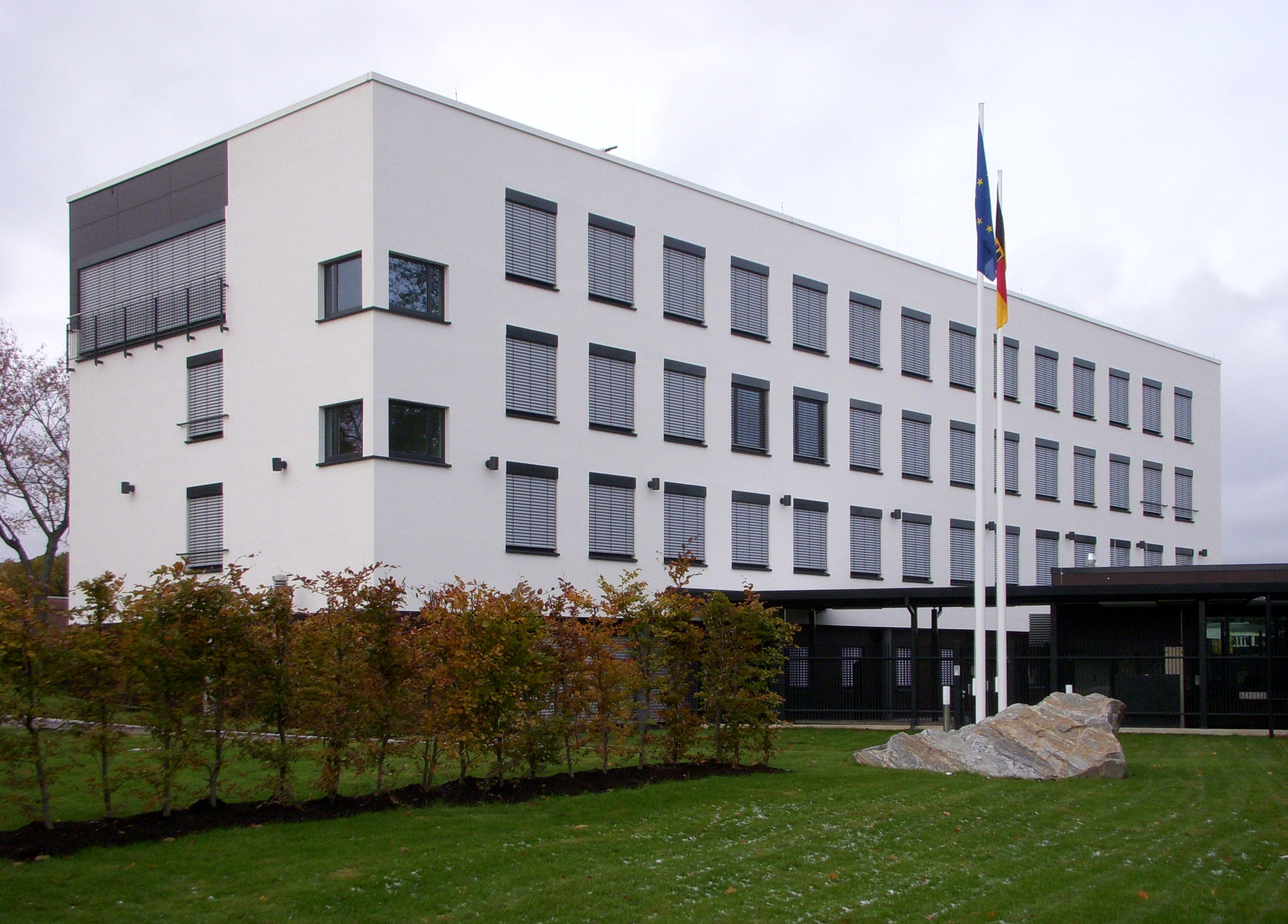
Embassy in Stockholm

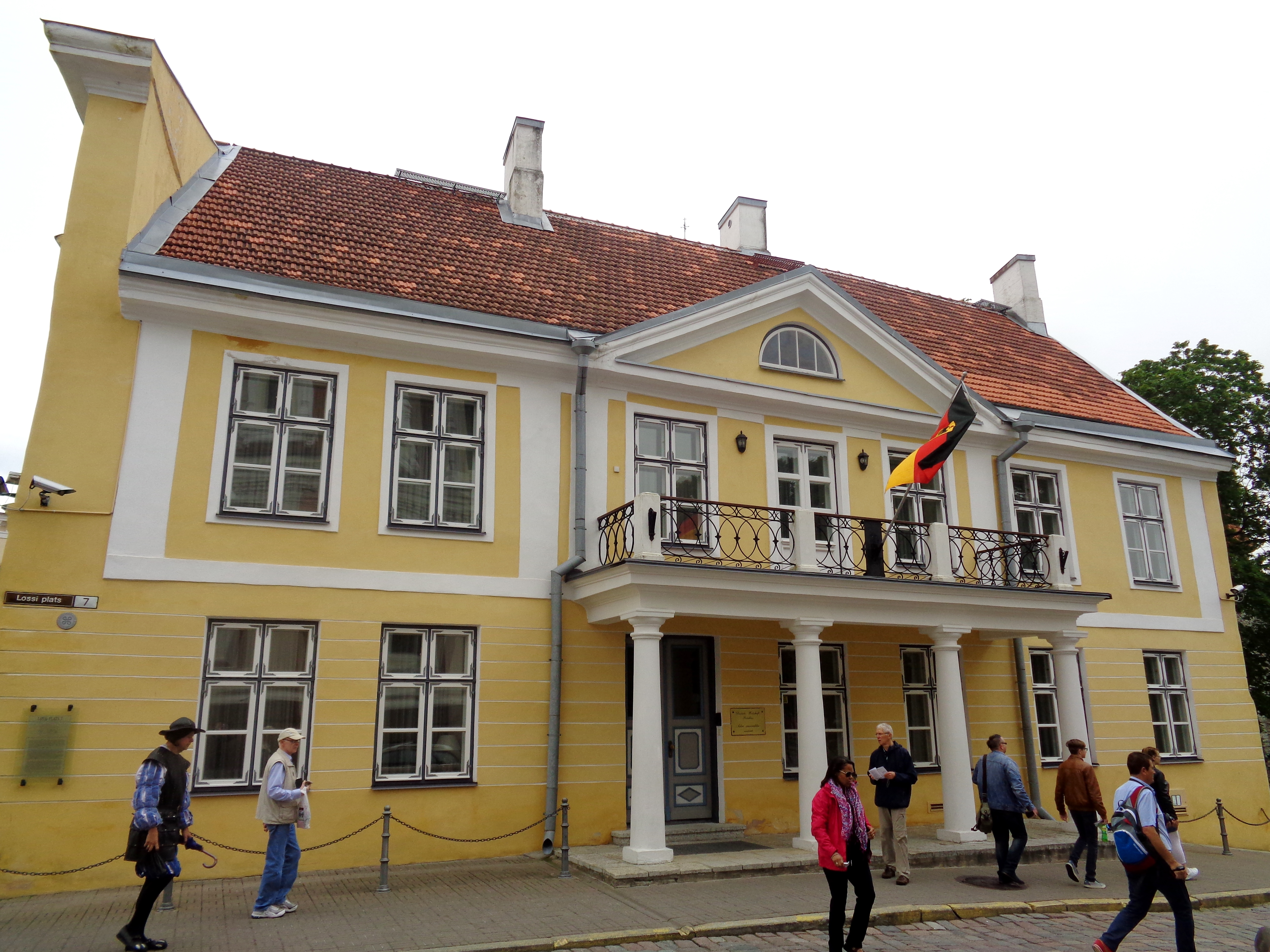
Embassy in Tallinn

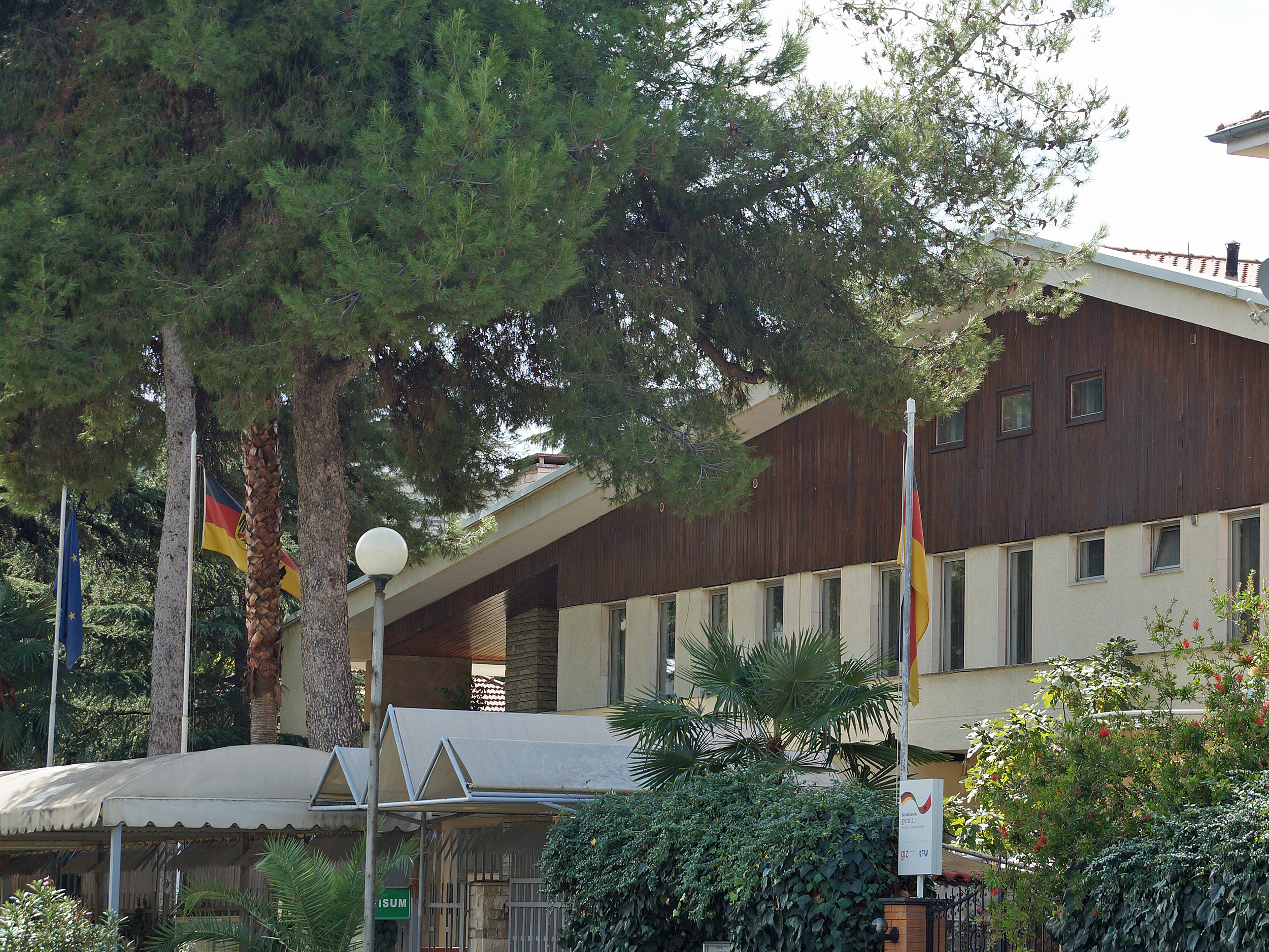
Embassy in Tirana

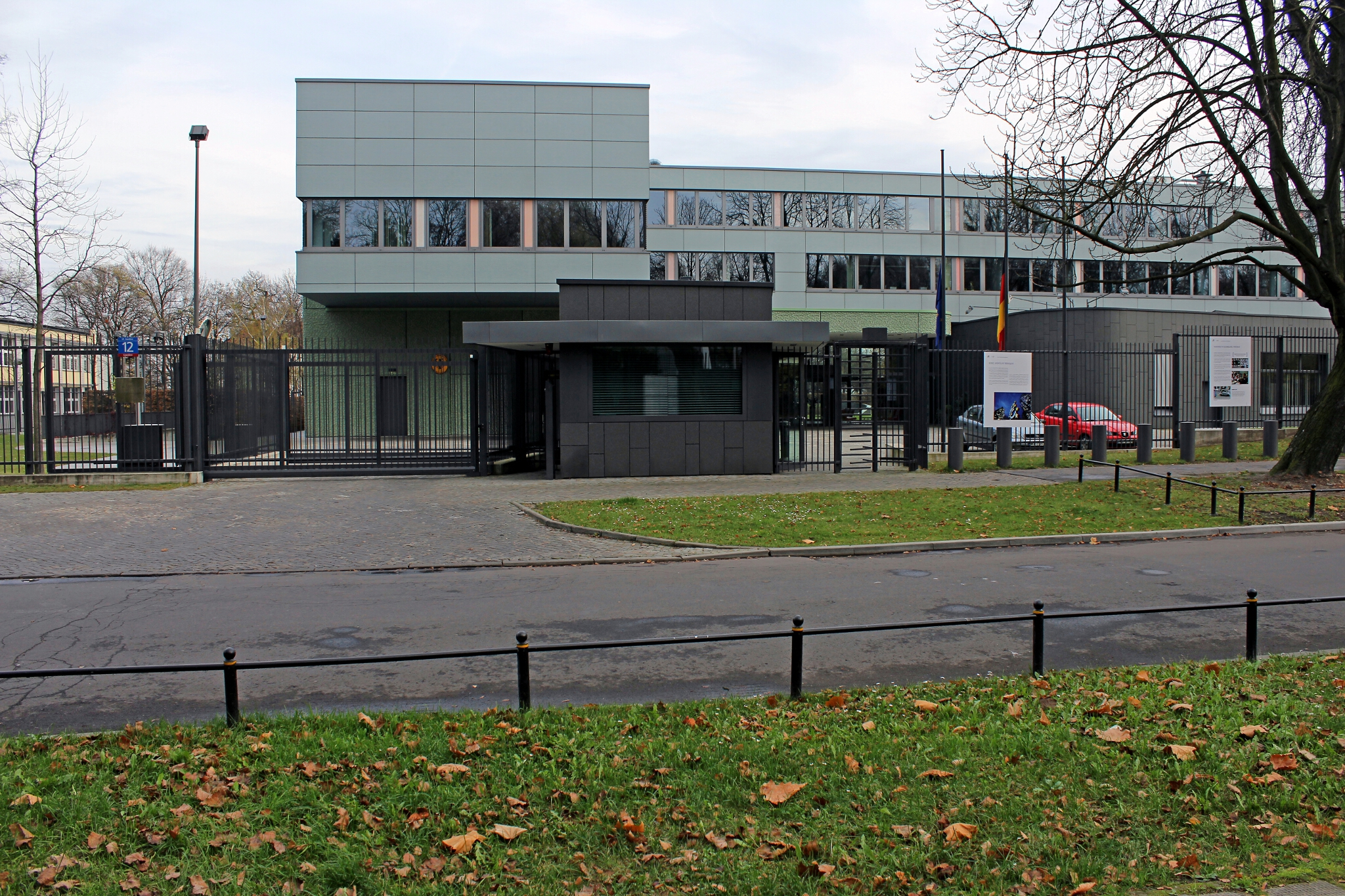
Embassy in Warsaw

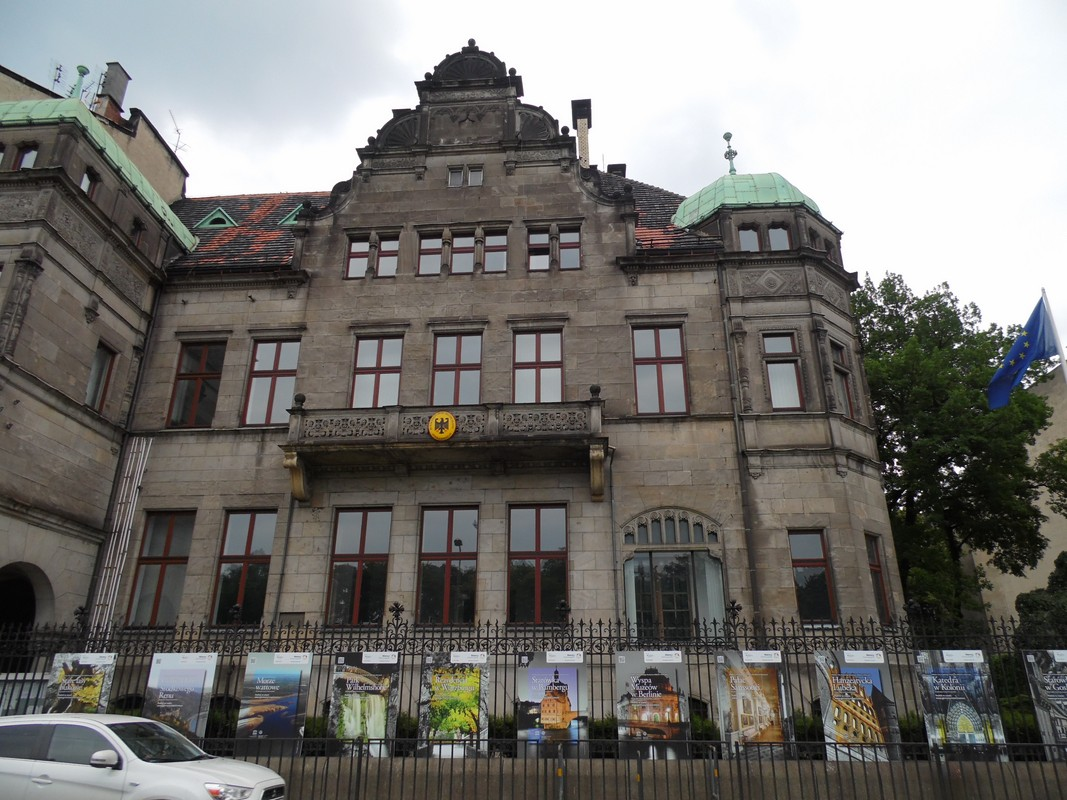
Consulate-General in Wrocław

=== Oceania ===
Host country	Host city	Mission	Concurrent accreditation	Ref.
Australia	Canberra	Embassy	Countries: Nauru; Papua New Guinea; Solomon Islands; Vanuatu	
Australia	Sydney	Consulate-General	Countries: Nauru; Papua New Guinea; Solomon Islands; Vanuatu	
Fiji	Suva	Embassy	Countries: Kiribati; Samoa; Tonga; Tuvalu	
New Zealand	Wellington	Embassy	Countries: Cook Islands; Niue	

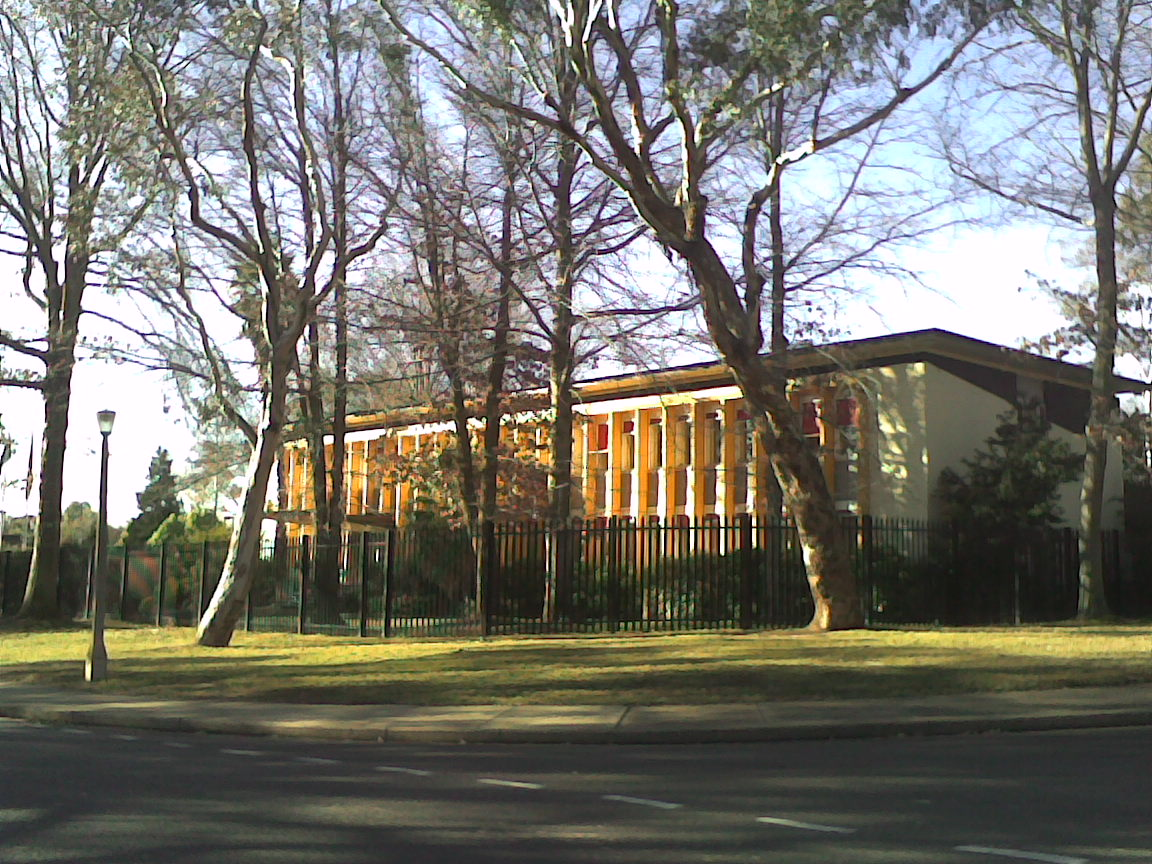
Embassy in Canberra

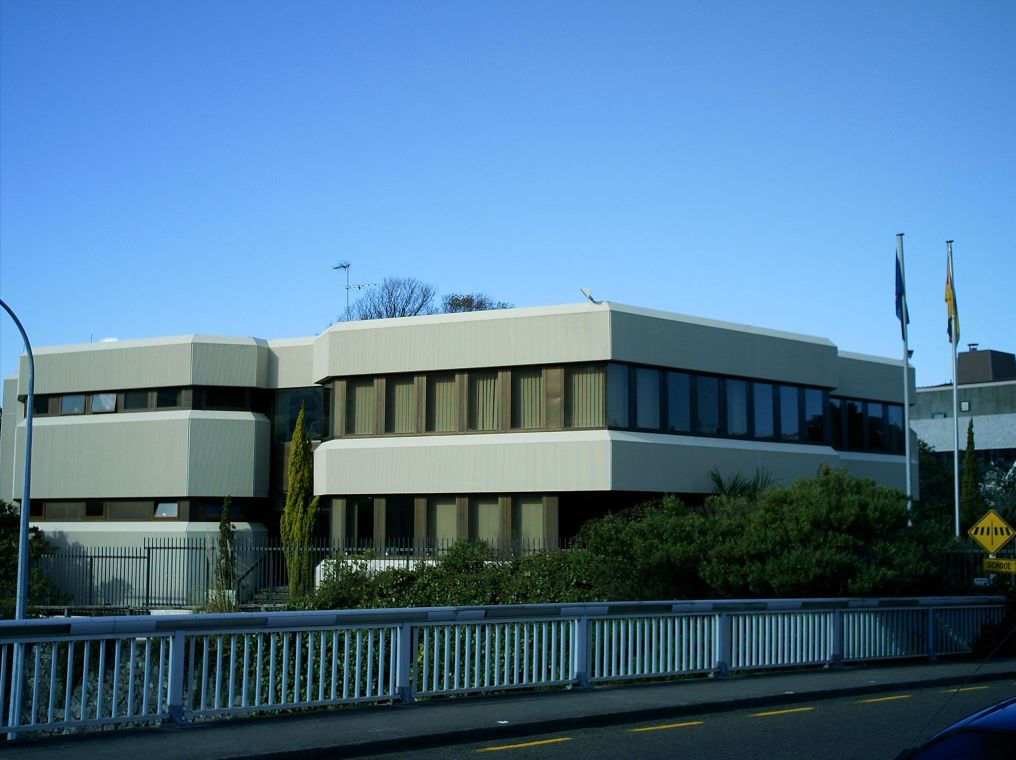
Embassy in Wellington

=== Multilateral organisations ===
Organization	Host city	Host country	Mission	Concurrent accreditation	Ref.
Conference on Disarmament	Geneva	Switzerland	Permanent Mission		
Council of Europe	Strasbourg	France	Permanent Mission		
European Union	Brussels	Belgium	Permanent Representation		
Food and Agriculture Organization	Rome	Italy	Permanent Representation	Multilateral Organizations: International Fund for Agricultural Development; World Food Programme	
NATO	Brussels	Belgium	Permanent Delegation		
OECD	Paris	France	Permanent Representation		
OPCW	The Hague	Netherlands	Permanent Representation		
OSCE	Vienna	Austria	Permanent Representation		
United Nations	New York City	United States	Permanent Mission		
United Nations	Geneva	Switzerland	Permanent Mission	Multilateral Organizations: United Nations Conference on Trade and Development; World Health Organization; World Intellectual Property Organization; World Meteorological Organization; World Trade Organization	
United Nations	Vienna	Austria	Permanent Mission	Multilateral Organizations: International Atomic Energy Agency; CTBTO Preparatory Commission; United Nations Industrial Development Organization; UNODC	
UNESCO	Paris	France	Permanent Representation		

== Closed missions ==
The following German mission existed after 1952 at certain times, but were subsequently closed.

=== Africa ===
Host country	Host city	Mission	Year closed	Ref.
Cameroon	Douala	Embassy Branch Office	1997	
Central African Republic	Bangui	Embassy	1997	
Equatorial Guinea	Malabo	Embassy	2021	
Lesotho	Maseru	Embassy	1994	
Libya	Bengazi	Embassy Branch Office	1974	
Malawi	Blantyre	Embassy (Note: The embassy was moved to Lilongwe in 1979)	1979	
Morocco	Casablanca	Consulate General	1996	
Morocco	Tangiers	Embassy Branch Office	1999	
Morocco	Tétouan	Embassy Branch Office	1960	
Nigeria	Kaduna	Consulate	1989	
Somalia	Mogadishu	Embassy	1991	
South Africa	Durban	Consulate	1992	
South Africa	Johannesburg	Consulate General	1997	
Sudan	Khartoum	Embassy	2023	

=== Americas ===
Host country	Host city	Mission	Year closed	Ref.
Argentina	Córdoba	Consulate	1993	
Argentina	Rosario	Consulate	1959	
Brazil	Belo Horizonte	Consulate	1968/70	
Brazil	Curitiba	Consulate General	2000	
Canada	Edmonton	Consulate General	1994	
Canada	Winnipeg	Consulate	1976	
Chile	Concepción	Consulate General	1993	
Chile	Valdivia	Consulate	1961	
Chile	Valparaiso	Consulate General	1973	
Colombia	Cali	Consulate	1959	
Ecuador	Guayaquil	Consulate General	1973	
Guyana	Georgetown	Embassy	2011	
Mexico	Monterrey	Consulate	1959	
United States	Cleveland	Consulate General	1974	
United States	Detroit	Consulate General	2000	
United States	Kansas City	Consulate	1969	
United States	Minneapolis	Consulate	1959	
United States	New Orleans	Consulate General	1990	
United States	Philadelphia	Consulate General	1974	
United States	Seattle	Consulate General	2000/2002	
United States	St. Louis	Consulate	1974	

=== Asia ===
Host country	Host city	Mission	Year closed	Ref.
Afghanistan	Kabul	Embassy	2021	
Afghanistan	Mazar-i-Sharif	Consulate-General	2021	
North Korea	Pyongyang	Embassy	2020	
South Vietnam (Note: The embassy closed down on 24 April 1975, in the midst of the Fall of Saigon, which marked the end of the Vietnam War and the start of a transition period to the formal reunification of Vietnam.)	Saigon	Embassy (Note: Continues as a consulate-general in Ho Chi Minh City nowadays.)	1975	
Syria	Aleppo	Consulate	1966/1973	
Turkey	Mersin	Vice Consulate	1994	
North Yemen	Aden	Embassy, Consulate General (1990-1996)	1996	
Yemen	Sana'a	Embassy	2015	
South Yemen	Taiz	Embassy	1965	

=== Europe ===
Host country	Host city	Mission	Year closed	Ref.
Austria	Bregenz	Consulate	1961	
Austria	Graz	Consulate-General	1998	
Austria	Innsbruck	Consulate-General	1998	
Austria	Klagenfurt	Consulate	1973	
Austria	Linz	Consulate	1973	
Austria	Salzburg	Consulate-General	1995	
Belgium	Antwerp	Consulate-General	1997	
Belgium	Liège	Consulate-General	1993	
Bosnia and Herzegovina	Banja Luka	Liaison office	2012	
Denmark	Aabenraa	Consulate-General	2000	
East Germany	East Berlin	Permanent Mission (Note: Permanent mission of Federal Republic of Germany closed, due to the reunification of Germany.)	1989/1990	
France	Lille	Consulate-General	1993	
France	Nancy	Consulate-General	1995	
Hungary	Pécs	Consulate-General	1994	
Italy	Genoa	Consulate-General	1999	
Italy	Naples	Consulate-General	2013	
Italy	Palermo	Consulate-General	1995	
Netherlands	Maastricht	Consulate	1971	
Netherlands	Rotterdam	Consulate General	1987/1990	
Norway	Bergen	Consulate	1981	
Poland	Szczecin	Consulate-General	2001	
Portugal	Porto	Consulate-General, later Consulate	2010	
Russia	Kaliningrad	Consulate-General	2023	
Russia	Novosibirsk	Consulate-General	2023	
Russia	Saint Petersburg	Consulate-General	2026	
Russia	Saratov	Consulate-General	2004	
Russia	Yekaterinburg	Consulate-General	2023	
Spain	Bilbao	Consulate-General	1996	
Spain	Santa Cruz de Tenerife	Branch Office	2003	
Spain	Seville	Consulate-General	2010	
Sweden	Gothenburg	Consulate-General	1997	
Sweden	Malmö	Consulate-General	1983	
Switzerland	Basel	Consulate-General	1980	
Switzerland	Zürich	Consulate-General	2000	
Ukraine	Donetsk	Consulate-General	2022	
United Kingdom	Liverpool	Consulate-General	1991	
United Kingdom	Manchester	Consulate-General	2000	

=== Oceania ===
Host country	Host city	Mission	Year closed	Ref.
Australia	Melbourne	Consulate General	2011	
Australia	Perth	Consulate	1959	
Papua New Guinea	Port Moresby	Embassy	1999	

== Travel warnings and "Krisenvorsorgeliste" ==
Germany regularly publishes travel warnings on the website of the Auswärtiges Amt (Federal Foreign Office) to its citizens. The Office allows German citizens to register online in a special list, the Krisenvorsorgeliste ("Crisis preparedness list") before they travel abroad (Elektronische Erfassung von Deutschen im Ausland [ELEFAND] Electronic Registration of Germans Being Abroad). With a password, the registered persons can change or update their data. The registration is voluntary and free of charge. It can be used for longer stays (longer than 3 months), but also for a vacation of only two weeks. The earliest date of registration is 10 days before the planned trip.

== See also ==
- Foreign relations of Germany
- List of diplomatic missions in Germany
- PSA BPOL the security team tasked with providing protection for German embassies abroad
- List of German consuls in Jerusalem, Jaffa, Haifa and Eilat § List of consuls in Eilat
