= Middle Eastern foreign policy of the Narendra Modi government =

The Middle East region plays a vital role in India's economy as it supplies nearly two-thirds of India's total oil import, bilateral trade is also flourishing in recent years particularly with UAE and other Arab states of the Persian Gulf. Over the years, millions of Indians mostly working class have migrated to the Persian Gulf region looking for jobs and they account for a sizeable share in the total remittances received from abroad. Indian External Affairs Ministry refers the region as West Asia and not as Middle East which is a more popular attribution, particularly in the Western countries.

== Link West policy ==
In an attempt to strengthen ties with India's western neighbours, especially the Persian Gulf countries, Modi proposed this policy to complement his Act East policy concerning East Asia. Although it is called "Link West" (west of India) which gives it a bigger geographical connotation, it is most likely to focus on the middle-east and some of the India's strategic thinkers are calling it as Modi's middle-east policy.

== Bahrain ==
Swaraj chose Manama, Bahrain for her first visit to the Persian Gulf. The visit marked the first high level exchange from Modi govt to any Arab states following apprehension of less priority given to the Indo-Arab relation under Modi administration. The island country with a significant population of Indian origin people has extensive trade and business ties with India. There addressing at a business meet the minister reiterated "Our government is firmly committed to bring back growth, have clear policies which will facilitate business environment, transparency and speed, well thought out decisions". In order to boost maritime cooperation with the Persian Gulf countries India sent ICGS Vijit, a Vishwast class offshore patrol vessel, to a 4 nations friendly visit including Bahrain in late December 2014.

== Iraq ==
=== Iraqi Kurdistan ===
Prior to the Modi administration, there had been limited diplomatic relations between India and Iraqi Kurdistan. India purchases Kurdish crude oil sold through Turkish companies. Several Indian citizens work in Iraqi Kurdistan. Many Kurds travel to India for educational or medical purposes. In July 2014, Hemin Hawrami, head of the Kurdistan Democratic Party's international relations wing, told The Hindu that he hoped for deeper political and economic ties with India, describing the country as "an important partner". Hawrani also expressed his desire to see the Indian government open a consulate in Erbil, and invited Indian companies to invest in Kurdistan. In November 2014, the Indian government sent special envoy Ambassador Suresh K. Reddy to visit Kurdistan and meet Kurdish government officials. Reddy stated that India "fully supports the Kurdistan Region during this difficult time", and expressed confidence in the Kurdish government and the Peshmerga forces to preserve the stability and security of the region. The Ambassador also praised the role of Peshmerga forces in fighting ISIL, and announced that the Indian government would open a consulate in Kurdistan.

== Israel ==
Israel is one of India's most important strategic partner and major source of its military hardware. Relation is expected to flourish with Modi government as the ruling Bharatiya Janata Party is known for its pro-Israeli stands and in favour of strengthening ties with Israel. Sushma Swaraj, who was chairperson of the 'India-Israel parliamentary friendship group', visited Israel earlier and called Israel a reliable partner besides expressing her admiration for former Israeli Prime Minister Golda Meir.

In September 2014, Modi met his Israeli counterpart Benjamin Netanyahu in the first interaction between the premiers of the two countries in 11 years with the leader of the Jewish state saying, "Sky is the limit." for bilateral relations. Later on India has decided to buy Israeli anti-tank Spike missile instead of Javelin missile offered by the US which signifies the depth of Israel-India bilateral relation specially with BJP government in New Delhi. The contract is expected to be worth $525 million, making Israel India's second biggest arm supplier after Russia.

Home Minister Rajnath Singh became the first minister of the Modi government to visit Israel. His trip featured a series of high level meetings with top Israeli leadership including Defence Minister Moshe Ya'alon, National Security Adviser Yossi Cohenand, Public Security Minister Yitzhak Aharonovich and the Prime Minister following which Netanyahu said that Indians and Israelis share the combination of ingenuity and continuity. It was the first visit of an Indian Home Minister to Israel since June 2000 when Lal Krishna Advani visited Jerusalem, marking an upsurge in bilateral cooperation. On the same day Modi met former Israeli President and Nobel laureate Shimon Peres in New Delhi. In the meeting Modi informed Peres about his strong desire to further expand and strengthen India's relations with Israel, both in traditional areas as well as in new areas of cooperation.

2014 Israel-Hamas conflict

At the height of the tension between Israel and Hamas in July, India offered a rhetorical condemnation holding both sides responsible for erupting violence and asked Israel to "stop disproportionate use of force" in Gaza which was read by many as departure from tradition of more vocal supports for the Palestinian cause. External Affairs Minister Swaraj insisted that "there is absolutely no change in India's policy towards Palestine, which is that we fully support the Palestinian cause while maintaining good relations with Israel", clarifying India's current position on the issue.

Sushma Swaraj, a seasoned parliamentarian, had herself blocked the opposition demand in Rajya Sabha for passing a resolution condemning Israel for 2014 Israel-Gaza conflict by saying, "India has friendly relation with both Israel and Palestine and therefore any such move may impact its friendship negatively". Although later in a symbolic gesture India joined others BRICS nations in voting at the United Nations Human Rights Council for a probe into the alleged human rights violation in Gaza, which generated mixed response among media and analysts in India.

== Oman ==
External Affairs Minister Swaraj made a two-day visit to Oman, her maiden visit to the oil-rich Persian Gulf country, on 17 February 2015 where she met her counterpart Yusuf bin Alawi bin Abdullah and discussed bilateral issues of mutual interests. The Omani top leadership expressed their interests in developing a strong political, economic and strategic relation with India. Swaraj had said that the welfare of the diaspora is among her top priority in the Persian Gulf region which host more than 7 million Indian workers.

== United Arab Emirates ==
Economic cooperation defines the bilateral relations between India and the United Arab Emirates, as the UAE is one of the largest trading partners of India. Foreign Minister Swaraj during her maiden trip to Abu Dhabi tried to win the confidence of potential UAE investors and welcomed them to join the new Indian govt effort to build world class infrastructure in India which is expected to require foreign investments up to US$1 trillion in next five years. She had also held discussion with her counterpart Sheikh Abdullah bin Zayed Al Nahyan, during the meeting, both sides reviewed the existing bilateral relations and took stock of progress and development in joint cooperation in many areas and looked into the ways of enhancing them for common interests.

== See also ==
- Foreign policy of the Narendra Modi government
- Asian foreign policy of the Narendra Modi government
- De-hyphenation
- List of international prime ministerial trips made by Narendra Modi
- Sushma Swaraj as Minister of External Affairs
- Middle Eastern foreign policy of the Barack Obama administration
