= Asian foreign policy of the Narendra Modi government =

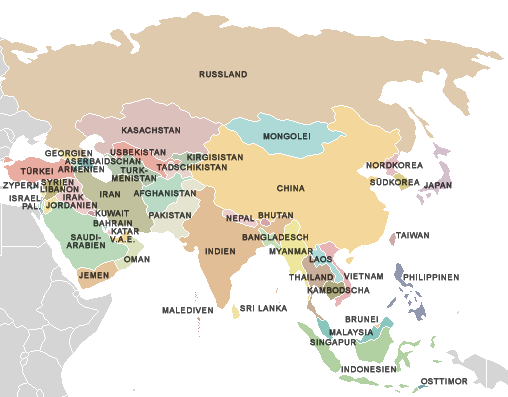
Asian neighbours possess great deal of importance in Modi's foreign policy

The most significant initiative made by the Narendra Modi government is the focus on neighbouring countries and major Asian powers coupled with emphasizing on the two decades old Look East policy. Asia being the major focus area of his foreign policy, Modi and his foreign minister chose several Asian countries for their initial bilateral visits. He has made state visits to Bhutan and Nepal and Japan within the first 100 days of his government and also hosted Asian leaders like former Prime Minister Tony Abbott of Australia, Paramount leader Xi Jinping of China and Prime Minister Nguyễn Tấn Dũng of Vietnam, apart from inviting SAARC leaders in his inauguration ceremony. External Affairs Minister Sushma Swaraj has also made official visits to several Asian capitals like Dhaka, Bangladesh, Kathmandu, Nepal, Naypidaw, Myanmar, Singapore, Hanoi, Vietnam, Manama, Bahrain, Kabul, Afghanistan, Dushanbe, Tajikistan, Malé, Maldives, Abu Dhabi, United Arab Emirates, Seoul, South Korea and Beijing China.

== Asian Century ==
Time and again Modi emphasized his belief in the 21st century being the Asian century and also asked whether it would be the Indian Century. China, Japan, India and South Korea being the first, second, third and fourth largest Asian economy respectively are among the most likely candidate to lead the strategically important Asia in the later part of this century. But China's increasingly assertive postures in the region recent years have raised concerns in the respective quarters. It seems Modi's foreign policy is focused on improving bilateral relations to higher levels with strategically located Asian countries like Japan, Vietnam, Australia without forging any formal security alliance in the Indo-Pacific region to avoid direct confrontation with China. India, due to its good relation with both Russia and United States, is often considered to be the swing state in the race for strategic dominance in Asia between the democratic alliance of Japan and US and China-Russia club on the other hand.

== Relations with East and Southeast Asia ==
From the very beginning the Modi-led government made it amply clear that India would focus more and more on improving relation with ASEAN and other East Asian countries as per India's Look East policy which was formulated during Narasimha Rao's govt in 1992 for better economic engagement with its eastern neighbours but successive govt later successfully turned it into a tool for forging strategic partnership and security cooperation with countries in that region in general and Vietnam and Japan in particular. In her recent visit to Hanoi, Vietnam Sushma Swaraj has stressed on the need for an Act East policy that she said should replace India's over two decade-old Look East policy emphasizing a more proactive role for India in this region.

=== Australia ===
Prime Minister Tony Abbott of Australia was the first head of government to make a state visit to India in Modi government which shows the importance both side attaches to their relations. The most significant event of his tour was the signing of a civil nuclear energy cooperation agreement for supplying uranium (Australia is believed to have one-third of world's total uranium reserve) to India. The nuclear deal is a further step toward India achieving international acceptability for its nuclear programme despite not ratifying the nuclear non-proliferation treaty, and follows similar agreements with the United States and France. The two side also agreed to enhance Maritime security cooperation in the Indo-pacific region and future joint naval exercise in the Indian Ocean. During the joint statement following the summit Australian PM Abbott referred India as a model citizen in terms of following International guidelines justifying the nuclear deal beyond the scope of NPT and called "India the emerging democratic superpower".

Security cooperation

In his address to the Australian parliament Modi made his apprehension public about maritime disputes and freedom of navigation in the oceans with a veiled reference of growing Chinese hegemony in the region. This has led to speculations among policy makers that Australia is re-joining the Malabar naval exercise amid Beijing's displeasure. Australia could join the India-US-Japan grouping, which is certain to set off alarm bells in Beijing. The issue of Australia joining the quadrilateral security dialogue was believed to be discussed at the highest level during Modi's Canberra visit on 17 November 2014. Earlier the two sides also agreed to enhance Maritime security cooperation in the Indo-pacific region and future joint naval exercise in the Indian Ocean.

=== China ===
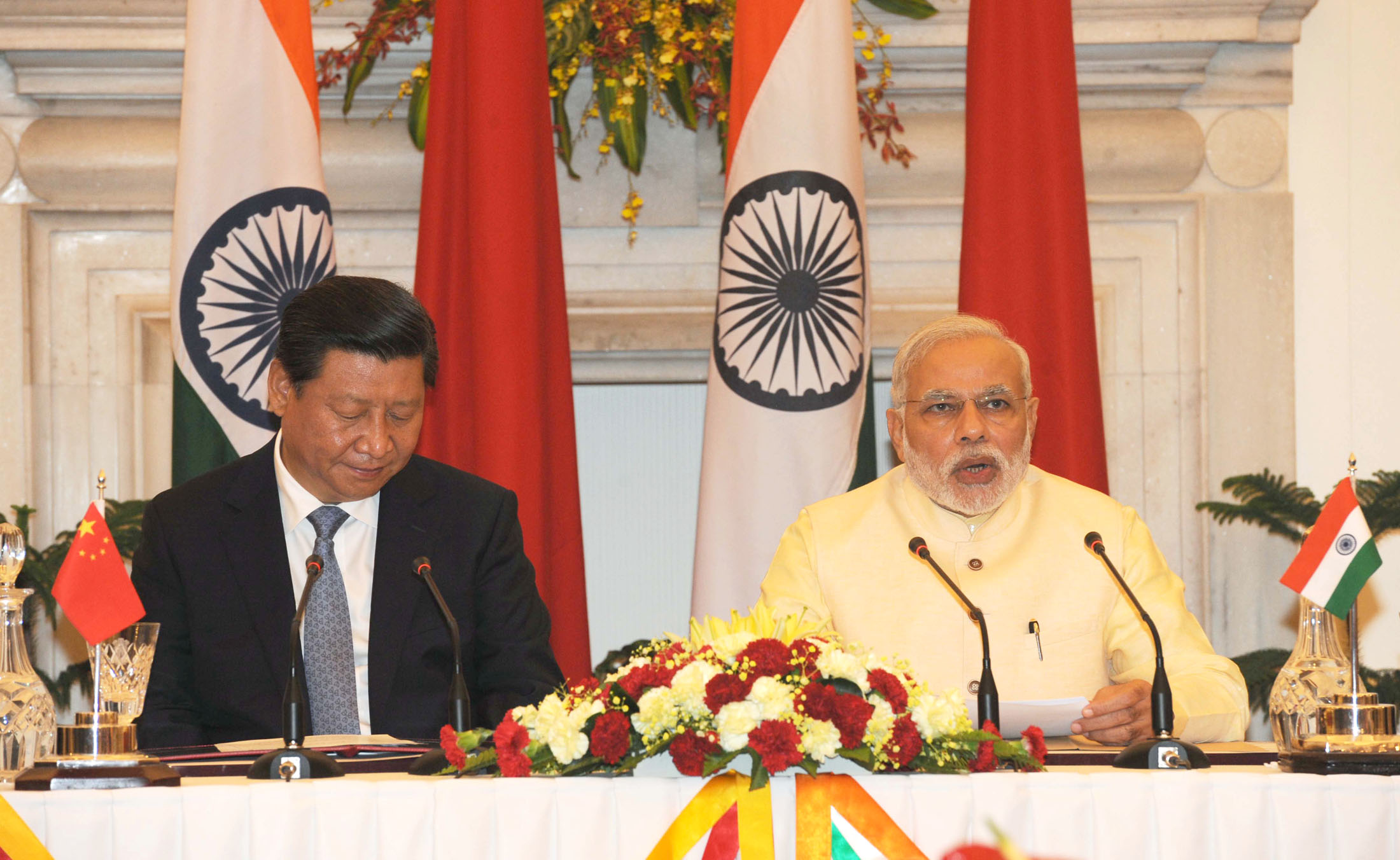
PM Modi with Chinese leader Xi Jinping, during latter's State Visit to India, September 2014.

Prior to election Modi had expressed reservation over alleged Chinese 'expansionism' into India's frontiers as India and China locked into bitter territorial disputes over last fifty years. During his Japan trip, Modi has said eighteenth century mind-set of vistaar-vad or expansionism won’t work and vikaash-vad or peaceful development is needed for sustainable peace and tranquility in the world which was read by a portion of media as a subtle jibe on China. But he is also in favour of enhanced economic partnership with China.

Economic activity defines relation with China as it is India's biggest trading partner in goods. Soon after taking office commerce Minister Nirmala Sitharaman has already made two visits to China. The two countries have forged a mechanism called 'strategic and economic dialogue' (SED) to discuss the trade and other economic issues. Modi has publicly expressed his willingness to enhance trade and economic cooperation with China. Describing the newly found activism in bilateral relation Modi said India China relation moving "INCH (India-China) towards MILES(Millennium of Enhanced Synergy)".

India sent National Security Adviser Ajit Doval as a special envoy of Prime Minister Modi to Beijing to negotiate the agenda and the schedule of the presidential visit to India which is appreciated by the top Chinese leadership who are known to be fond of diplomatic decorum. CCP General Secretary Xi Jinping, only third General Secretary of the Chinese Communist Party to visit India, arrived in Ahmedabad, Modi's hometown, on 17 September which coincides with Modi's birthday. China is expected to commit investment over US$100 billion in India's infrastructure projects including in high speed trains and dedicated Chinese industrial parks to balance the huge trade deficit exists in China's favour. The two leaders had earlier met in Brazil this year on the sidelines of BRICS summit.

=== Japan ===
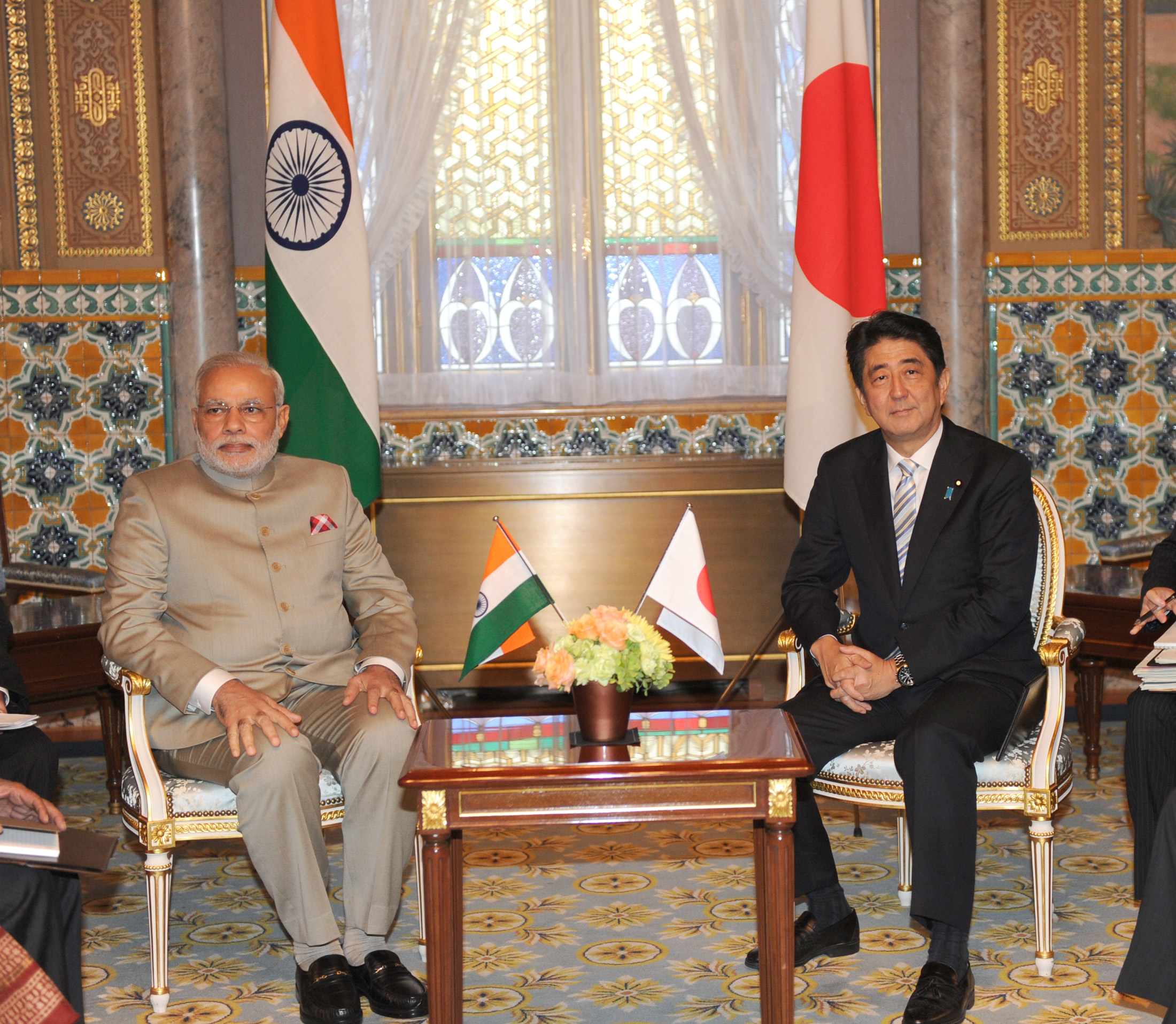
Prime Ministers Narendra Modi and Shinzo Abe, during former's bilateral visit to Japan, 2014.

Japan occupies a very important place in Modi’s Asian strategy, as India is looking toward Japan, at a time when it is becoming 'normal state' amending decades-old pacifist constitution, to forge a security alliance to balance an increasingly assertive China in the Indo-Pacific region. Maritime cooperation is most likely and bilateral naval exercises are on the cards. Significantly in 2014 Japan participated in the Malabar, a primarily bilateral naval exercise between India and US, held in Sea of Japan. Negotiations progressed recently for selling of US 2 amphibious aircraft to Indian Navy and the long-pending civil nuclear agreements which would eventually help strengthen the strategic partnership.

Modi visited Japan on a five-day official trip from 30 August to 3 September which was labelled as his first bilateral state visit outside the subcontinent also by the media. His 2014 visit further strengthened the ties between the two countries and resulted in several key agreements, including the elevation of already established strategic partnership to the "Special Strategic Global Partnership". Business ties are stronger than ever with a commitment of US$33.5 billion Japanese investment in India in the next five year. India is in the process of importing Shinkansen technology from Japan as part of Modi’s Diamond Quadrilateral project for introducing high-speed rail in India.

His visit to Kyoto supervised the signing of a cooperation agreement between Varanasi and Kyoto both regarded as heritage city and cultural centre in their respective country.

=== Myanmar ===
Despite sharing a long border with India, Myanmar was often left out of India's neighbourhood policy, but Myanmar was identified as India's gateway to the Southeast Asia and therefore the focus is on rebuilding the historic relations between the two countries. Modi visited the eastern neighbour to attend a couple of multilateral meetings including the East Asia Summit. He met President Thein Sein for the first time on 11 November 2014 and they identified three 'C's to strengthen their bilateral relations, those are connectivity, cultural links and people to people contacts. Among which connectivity is all set to get a big boost with projects like upcoming Imphal-Mandalaya Bus service, India-Myanmar-Thailand trilateral highway, Kaladan Multi-modal Transit Transport Project and the two sides also focused on the need of direct air links. The two sides also discussed the possibility of Indian investment in Myanmar's special economic zones and ways to enhance bilateral trade which stands at US$2 billion, well below the potential. During a 2017 visit to Nay Pyi Taw, Prime Minister Modi announced that India would offer gratis/no-cost visas to all Myanma citizens visiting India.

Modi met the Nobel laureate and Myanmar's opposition leader Aung San Suu Kyi and referred her as "symbol of democracy" for her untiring efforts for the restoration of democracy in her country and he presented her with a special copy of Mahatma Gandhi's commentary on Bhagwad Gita. Suu Kyi also reciprocated by calling India, her "second home" recalling her early days spent in India. The two leaders have discussed the importance of democracy for the stability of the region as a whole.

In contrast to much of the international community, Prime Minister Modi declined to criticize Suu Kyi's handling of the 2016–17 Northern Rakhine State clashes or Myanmar's government's treatment of its Rohingya people.

=== Singapore ===
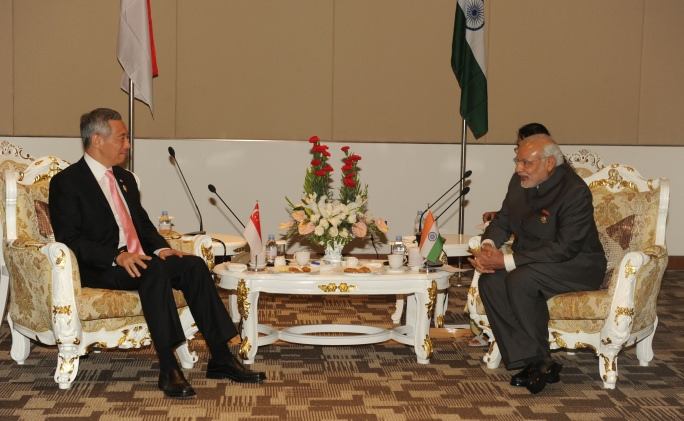
Singapore's Prime Minister Lee Hsien Loong with Modi.

Singapore is amongst the top source countries of foreign direct investment (FDI) coming to India. Economic cooperation dominates the India–Singapore relations given Singapore's strategic importance in India's 'Look East' policy. External Affairs Minister Swaraj visited Singapore on 16 August where she held talks with her counterpart Shanmugam and Prime Minister Lee Hsien Loong regarding Singapore's investment in India and their potential role in Modi's pet smart city project.

Earlier Modi played host to Singaporean Minister for Foreign and Law K. Shanmugam where he recalled his policies as Gujarat chief minister to expand cooperation between the two countries in, amongst others, public housing for the middle and lower classes based on Singapore's expertise.

The former Singaporean prime minister, Goh Chok Tong, visited India on 10 September and held several high-level meetings with the Indian prime minister and other ministers; later in conversation with a selected members from the media he referred to the former Indian prime minister, Vajpeyee, as a scholar, but Modi is a "Man of Action", while reassuring once again his country's full cooperation on the smart city project.

=== Republic of Korea ===
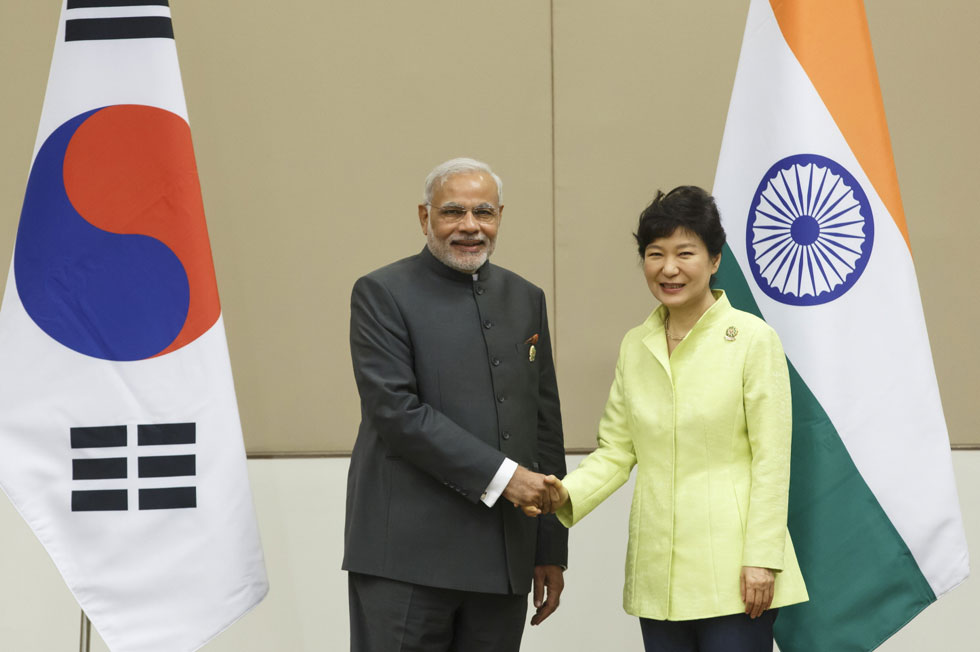
President Park Geun-hye poses for a photo with Indian Prime Minister Narendra Modi prior to the Korea-India summit in Naypyidaw, Myanmar

According to Modi, South Korea features prominently in India's Act East policy where it can play an important role both in term of economic and strategic partnership. Modi visited South Korea as part of his East Asia tour on 18–19 May 2015 at the invitation of President Park Geun-hye. The two leaders previously met in Nay Pyi Taw, Myanmar at the sidelines of East Asia Summit in November 2014. Modi's visit came after a series of high-profile ministerial visits including Foreign Minister, Defense Minister and Commerce Minister from India to Seoul which demonstrates the depth of India-South Korea strategic relations. During Modi's visit the two sides agreed to upgrade their relation to "special strategic relations" and also re-energized the comprehensive economic partnership agreement (CEPA) signed five years ago. Modi also stressed on the need of South Korean defense majors investing in India as per Make In India initiative where he particularly impressed by Korean shipbuilding capacity.

=== Taiwan ===
As Modi has identified economic cooperation as a major thrust area in his foreign policy and introduced policies like Make in India to invite foreign direct investment (FDI) in the manufacturing sector, Taiwan was one of the first to respond to his call. India Electronics and Semiconductor Association (IESA) and Taipei Computer Association signed memorandum of understanding for local manufacturing of semiconductors and electronics, even there are plans to set up 'Taiwanese hardware park' in about 200–300 acres of land. Although India was among the first few countries to recognize PRC therefore jeopardizing relation with the island but later developed an official relation with ROC which it maintains through India-Taipei Association ITA a De facto embassy in Taipei.

=== Vietnam ===
Vietnam, strategically located in the South China Sea, plays a pivotal role in India's Southeast Asian policy and it is often referred as one of the important pillars of its "Look East policy" by the Indian diplomats. Defence and security cooperation in recent years define the strategic partnership along with fast-growing bilateral trade which stood at US$8 billion in FY 2013.

Visiting Indian President Pranab Mukherjee called Vietnam, "a trusted friend and an important pillar of India's Look East Policy" which emphasized the depth of their strategic partnership. The leaders reiterated their desire and determination to work together to maintain peace, stability, growth and prosperity in Asia. The two sides vouched for 'freedom of navigation' in the South China Sea, which China claims as its exclusive economic zone, and called upon the parties concerned to exercise restraint, avoid threat or use of force and resolve disputes through peaceful means in accordance with universally recognised principles of international law, including the United Nations Convention on the Law of the Sea-1982.

India-Vietnamese defence cooperation has multiplied in recent years with emphasis on maritime security which includes training of Vietnamese naval personnel with Indian naval ships making frequent port-call in Vietnam in past few years. Recently it extended a US$100 m Line of Credit for purchase of Fast attack craft for Vietnamese navy from India. Vietnam is also interested in acquiring BrahMos supersonic missiles, an Indo-Russian joint venture project, Vietnam has friendly relation with both Russia and India a precondition for exporting the missile system and talks regarding the deal is believed to be in the advanced level.

Agreements have been signed in oil exploration cooperation field between the two countries as Vietnam had earlier offered India to explore strategically located oil blocks in South China Sea, which is disputed by Chinese claims. On the following day Chinese Foreign Ministry through an official media statement expressed its objection to India's activity in what it refers its exclusive economic zone. External Affairs Minister earlier during her Hanoi trip said the state-owned ONGC Videsh will exploit the opportunity provided in Vietnam, a development China sees as an aggression into its backyard. Economic ties are fast growing with US$8 billion bilateral trade and the two sides emphasized the need of increasing people to people contact which is set to get a boost with upcoming launch of direct flight between Delhi and Ho Chi Minh City and using Bollywood to promote Vietnam to Indian audience.

== See also ==
- Foreign policy of the Narendra Modi government
- Middle Eastern foreign policy of the Narendra Modi government
- De-hyphenation
- List of international prime ministerial trips made by Narendra Modi
- Sushma Swaraj as Minister of External Affairs

== Notes ==
^{^[Note I]} In 2002, Atal Bihari Vajpayee had visited Nepal but for the 11th SAARC summit held at Kathmandu.
