= German-Indian =

German-Indian, Indian-German or Indo-German may refer to:

- Indo-German languages, alternative name for the Indo-European languages
- As an adjective, anything pertaining to Germany–India relations
- Indians in Germany
- Germans in India

== See also ==
- Hindu–German Conspiracy, 1914-17 plan for pan-Indian rebellion against the British Raj during WWI
