= List of ambassadors of Germany to India =

Ambassador of Germany to India
- Deutscher Botschafter in Indien
- Incumbent; Jasper Wieck since 2026
- Style: Ambassador
- Residence: Embassy of Germany, New Delhi
- Formation: 1952
- First holder: Ernst Meyer
- Website: https://india.diplo.de/in-en

India gained independence from the United Kingdom in 1947. Accordingly, there was only a German consular representation during the colonial period. The Federal Republic of Germany had an ambassador in India since 1952.

The German ambassadors in India were also responsible for Nepal and Bhutan at times.

== German Empire ==
| Name | Tenure | Office |
German Empire/Weimar Republic/Nazi Germany
| Hermann Gerlich | 1886–1889 | Consul General in Calcutta |
| Edmund Friedrich Gustav von Heyking | 1889–1893 | Consul General in Calcutta |
| Günther von Gaertner-Griebenow | 1893–1895 | Consul General in Calcutta |
| Julius von Waldthausen | 1895–1900 | Consul General in Calcutta |
| Hermann Speck von Sternburg | 1900–1903 | Consul General in Calcutta |
| Albert von Quadt zu Wykradt und Isny | 1904–1910 | Consul General in Calcutta |
| Heinrich XXXI. Reuß zu Köstritz | 1910–1912 | Consul General in Calcutta |
| Karl von Luxburg | 1912–1914 | Consul General in Calcutta |
1914–1922 no consular relations
| Heinrich Rüdt von Collenberg-Bödigheim | 1922–1929 | Consul General in Calcutta |
| Rudolf von Bassewitz | 1929–1932 | Consul General in Calcutta |
| Wernher von Ow-Wachendorf | 1933–1936 | Consul General in Calcutta |
| Erdmann von Podewils-Dürnitz | 1936–1939 | Consul General in Calcutta |
September 3, 1939 Relations are broken off due to World War II

== West Germany ==
The embassy has been based in New Delhi since 1952.

| Name | Tenure | Office |
West Germany
| Ernst Meyer | 1952–1957 | Ambassador in New Delhi |
| Wilhelm Melchers | 1957–1961 | Ambassador in New Delhi |
| Georg Ferdinand Duckwitz | 1961–1965 | Ambassador in New Delhi |
| Dietrich von Mirbach | 1965–1970 | Ambassador in New Delhi |
| Günter Diehl | 1970–1977 | Ambassador in New Delhi |
| Dirk Oncken | 1977–1979 | Ambassador in New Delhi |
| Rolf Ramisch | 1980–1984 | Ambassador in New Delhi |
| Günther Gerlach | 1984–1985 | Ambassador in New Delhi |
| Günther Schödel | 1984/85–1987 | Ambassador in New Delhi |
| Konrad Seitz | 1987–1990 | Ambassador in New Delhi |

== East Germany ==
| Name | Tenure | Office |
East Germany
| Herbert Meyer | 1956–1958 | Trade representative |
| Erich Renneisen | 1958–1962 | Trade representative |
| Kurt Böttger | 1962–1965 | Trade representative |
| Herbert Fischer | 1965–1972 | Trade representative |
Diplomatic relations after October 8, 1972
| Herbert Fischer | 1972–1974 | Ambassador in New Delhi |
| Wolfgang Schüßler | 1974–1977 | Ambassador in New Delhi |
| Heinz Birch | 1978–1984 | Ambassador in New Delhi |
| Bernd Biedermann | 1984–1988 | Ambassador in New Delhi |
| Wolfgang Grabowski | 1989–1990 | Ambassador in New Delhi |

== Germany since 1990 ==
| Name | Tenure | Office |
Germany
| Hans-Georg Wieck | 1990–1993 | Ambassador in New Delhi |
| Frank Elbe | 1993–1997 | Ambassador in New Delhi |
| Heinrich-Dietrich Dieckmann | 1997–2000 | Ambassador in New Delhi |
| Heimo Richter | 2000–2005 | Ambassador in New Delhi |
| Bernd Mützelburg | 2006–2008 | Ambassador in New Delhi |
| Thomas Matussek | 2009–2011 | Ambassador in New Delhi |
| Michael Steiner | 2012–2015 | Ambassador in New Delhi |
| Martin Ney | 2015–2019 | Ambassador in New Delhi |
| Walter Johannes Lindner | 2019–2022 | Ambassador in New Delhi |
| Philipp Ackermann | 2022–2026 | Ambassador in New Delhi |
| Jasper Wieck | 2026– | Ambassador in New Delhi |

== See also ==
- Embassy of Germany, New Delhi
- Germany–India relations
