= Hemin (given name) =

Hemin is a given name. Notable people with the given name include:

- Hemin Desai (born 1977), Indian-born Omani cricketer
- Hemin Hawrami (born 1976), Kurdish politician, writer, and academic
- Hemin Mukriyani (1921–1986), Kurdish poet, journalist, translator, and literary critic
