= Embassy of Germany, New Delhi =

German Embassy in New Delhi
- Location: New Delhi
- Address: No. 6/50G, Shanti Path, Chanakyapuri, New Delhi 110021
- Coordinates: 28°35′21″N 77°11′16″E
- Ambassador: Jasper Wieck
- Jurisdiction: India, Bhutan
- Website: india.diplo.de

The German Embassy in New Delhi is the diplomatic representation of Germany in the Republic of India. Since November 2020, the German Ambassador to India is also accredited to the Kingdom of Bhutan.

== Location and building ==
The embassy is located in the diplomatic district of Chanakyapuri in the Indian capital New Delhi. The diplomatic missions of Japan, Ethiopia and Canada are direct neighbors. The street address is: No. 6/50G, Shanti Path, Chanakyapuri, New Delhi 110021.

The embassy is located in the southwest of the city. The Ministry of External Affairs, located 4 km northeast of the embassy, can be reached in a few minutes. The Indira Gandhi International Airport is located around 8 km to the west.

The current German Embassy building in New Delhi was designed by Johannes Krahn and built between 1956 and 1962 as the first new embassy building of the Federal Republic of Germany on a park-like site. This was a reaction to the fact that India was one of the first countries to recognize the Federal Republic of Germany diplomatically after the Second World War. The Le Corbusier-inspired buildings for the chancellery and ambassador's residence form the main part of the property. Numerous extensions were added later. From 2008 to 2013, a general refurbishment was carried out in accordance with conservation principles.

== Mission ==
The German Embassy in New Delhi is tasked with maintaining Indo-German relations, representing German interests vis-à-vis the Government of India and informing the Federal Government of Germany about developments in India.

== History ==
India became independent from the United Kingdom on 15 August 1947. West Germany opened an embassy in New Delhi on 22 April 1952.

The GDR maintained an official trade mission in New Delhi from 1956, which was converted into a consulate general in 1970. On 8 October 1972, diplomatic relations were established with an exchange of ambassadors. The GDR embassy in New Delhi was closed in 1990 when the GDR joined the Federal Republic of Germany.

== See also ==
- List of ambassadors of Germany to India
- List of diplomatic missions of Germany
- Germany–India relations
