= Leipzig University internship controversy =

2015 racism scandal at Leipzig University

The Leipzig University internship controversy was a period in the spring of 2015 during which public concern was expressed about a member of the Leipzig University's faculty's apparent racist attitudes towards foreign candidates. The affair had political, academic and diplomatic fallout.

== Beginnings of the controversy ==
In March 2015, media reports appeared showing email messages sent by German Professor Annette Beck-Sickinger, the head of the biochemistry department at Leipzig University, to an anonymous male internship applicant from India. According to the released email texts, Beck-Sickinger does not accept “any Indian male students for internships”, and “many female professors in Germany decided to no longer accept male Indian students”. She references India's "rape problem" as the reason for not accepting any Indian male applicant for internships. Beck-Sickinger has described the released text as taken out of context but says she "made a mistake" in the incident. Subsequently, an additional anonymous Indian student released emails that appeared to show similar commentary made by Beck-Sickinger in 2014.

The alleged messages were publicly condemned in an open letter from German ambassador to India Michael Steiner. The incident occurred shortly before a scheduled official visit by Indian Prime Minister Narendra Modi at the invitation of German Chancellor Angela Merkel.

=== First disclosure ===
Reports alleging that a university professor in Germany does not accept “any Indian male students for internships”, and that “many female professors in Germany decided to no longer accept male Indian students” surfaced on social media in early March 2015. Screen-shots of e-mails, allegedly sent by Annette Beck-Sickinger of the Institute of Biochemistry at Leipzig University, appeared to show that she explained her actions by reference to India's 'culture of rape'. News reports stated that Huffington Post India contacted Prof. Beck-Sickinger who confirmed that the e-mails were real but insists that they were taken out of context.

On 9 March 2015, the German ambassador to India, Michael Steiner, rebuked Beck-Sickinger's opinions as oversimplified and discriminative. Steiner's apology contrasted that of the rector of Leipzig University, Professor Beate Schücking, who offered support for Beck-Sickinger's apology: “Her comments on the issue of violence against women in India were not her first answer but were made in reply to a provocative e-mail which followed the initial e-mail. To say it clearly: I do not tolerate these comments. However, I accept Professor Beck-Sickinger's apology. And I can say: the published e-mail has obviously been faked.”. Beate Schücking refused to speculate about consequences because the issue was currently being reviewed internally by her office and the Council of Deans and would be subject to review by the Academic Senate.

Besides Prof. Schücking, the students council of the Leipzig University had the chance to review all relevant e-mails. A statement was published saying that the student was rejected for formal reasons and in reply to the refusal, the student provoked a discussion about social and cultural problems in India. The mail which was initially published by the student is claimed to be fake, or a "mashup", though in earlier press reports the professor herself is reported to have confirmed that the mail is not a hoax.

While Leipzig University has declined to release the full text of the emails due to privacy issues, it released a statement in which it explained that the applicant had been rejected because there were no further internship openings, but had continued to converse with Beck-Sickinger by email. Beck-Sickinger released a statement in which she apologized for the incident, said she had "made a mistake", and pointed out that Indian students were members of both her research group and the internship program, but did not specify their genders.

=== Second disclosure ===
In the wake of the incident, a second anonymous Indian man alleged that he also had previously been rejected by Beck-Sickinger as a PhD candidate in early 2014. These emails allegedly contained the text:

thanks a lot for your application. Unfortunately I do no longer accept any male Indian guests, trainees, doctorial students or PostDocs due to the severe rape problem in India. I cannot support a society which is not able to respect females in any aspects. I think cultured people cannot close their eyes.

The university responded to the second set of allegations, saying that Beck-Sickinger had deleted the message in question and that she denies having responded as claimed.

== Reactions ==
=== Political ===
Junior minister of the Indian Government, Minister of State for External Affairs (Independent Charge) V. K. Singh, said that the incident was the result of "misunderstanding" of India and hoped that the matter could be resolved at the earliest. Nationalist Congress Party (NCP) leader Tariq Anwar said: “If such comment has been made, then it is condemnable. The Government of Germany should take cognizance of this and whosoever has said this, investigation should be done against that person. Such incidents only spoil the relations between two nations,”

The political response to the incident in Germany was muted despite the global media coverage. Saxony Regional Minister of Science, Eva-Maria Stange, said: “I assume that Professor Beck-Sickinger had no intention to hurt the feelings of the Indian students.”

=== Diplomatic ===
German ambassador to India Michael Steiner responded to the incident with an open letter, excerpted below, addressed to Beck-Sickinger.

“Your oversimplifying and discriminating generalisation is an offence to women and men ardently committed to furthering women's empowerment in India; and is an offence to millions of law-abiding, tolerant, open-minded and hard-working Indians. Let's be clear: India is not a country of rapists,”

“The 2012 Nirbhaya rape case has refocused attention on the issue of violence against women. Rape is indeed a serious issue in India as in most countries, including Germany. In India, the Nirbhaya case has triggered lively, honest, sustained and very healthy public debate - a public debate of a quality that wouldn't be possible in many other countries,”.

“I would encourage you to learn more about the diverse, dynamic and fascinating country and the many welcoming and open-minded people of India so that you could correct a simplistic image, which – in my opinion – is particularly unsuitable for a professor and teacher.”.

=== Academic ===
The incident gave rise to commentaries by European academics who scrutinized the underlying issues raised by the incident: persistence of a colonial mind-set in Europe, an anti-Indian bias in European media, the philosophical justification for an indiscriminate academic embargo, an overview of sex related crimes in Europe, and the human rights situation in Germany with regard to discrimination and treatment of minority groups in Germany.

- A professor in Germany is a civil servant of the German state. Is it suitable for a civil servant of the German state to be openly racist? - Benjamin Zachariah, Historian, University of Heidelberg, Germany
- India and the West could together look for solutions to the problems that we share. Instead, Western commentators reproduce old colonial stories about India as an immoral culture. This gives them a twisted relationship to the Indian people. On the one hand, they keep turning towards the same class of Indian journalists, activists, and intellectuals for ‘local knowledge’. But these native informants merely talk the talk of the West to the West. On the other hand, more and more Indians are disgusted by the West’s condescending attitude towards their country. And this is then dismissed as hurt pride. If we want to bring our two peoples and cultures closer together in this new age, reason and empathy are our only hope. The madness of the current discourse about India must end. - Jakob De Roover, University of Ghent, Belgium

Ranjan Ghosh, a lecturer at the Swedish University of Agricultural Sciences at Uppsala, and who formerly taught in Germany opined that the incident was most likely an isolated incident. Ranjan Ghosh acknowledged that despite regulations against any racial prejudice being stringent in Germany, after the Nirbhaya case, Indians are increasingly confronted with questions about India's rape situation.

The incident is seen as a fallout from biased views of India in Western media and comes on the heels of the controversy surrounding the release of the BBC documentary film about the 2012 Delhi gang rape called India's Daughter.

=== Social media ===
Social media called upon university authorities in Germany to offer an unconditional apology.

Public response in India, whilst unanimous in condemning Beck-Sickinger's comments and allegations of an academic boycott, were also severely critical of efforts undertaken by the government to prevent horrendous crimes, including rapes, in India.

In 2021, a Change.org petition was launched asking for Beck-Sickinger's dismissal.

== See also ==
- Germany–India relations
- General Equal Treatment Act of 2006, Germany (German anti-discrimination legislation)
- Rape in India
- Anti-Indian sentiment
