= Global swing state =

Middle power countries with great influence

Map of global swing states

Global swing states are middle power countries whose strategic choices have a significant impact on the international order due to their geopolitical influence, economic power, and diplomatic capabilities. These nations are considered pivotal in shaping global governance structures, balancing power dynamics, and influencing international norms and policies.

== Characteristics ==
Global swing states are countries that are considered leading middle powers. They possess certain key characteristics that distinguish them from other nations. These characteristics include:

- Geopolitical influence: They hold considerable sway in regional and global geopolitics, often acting as power brokers or regional leaders. However, they do not have the capacity to directly impose their influence globally.
- Economic power: These states have robust economies that contribute significantly to global trade, investment, and economic stability.
- Diplomatic capability: They possess the diplomatic clout to engage with multiple major powers and influence international negotiations and policies.
- Military strength: Their military capabilities enable them to play crucial roles in regional security and global stability.
- Soft power: They wield cultural, ideological, and political influence that extends beyond their borders.

== Role in global governance and geopolitics ==
Global swing states play a crucial role in global governance and geopolitics. Their strategic decisions can alter the balance of power, influence international norms, and drive global policy discussions. For instance, their positions on climate change, trade, and security are essential for forming international agreements and coalitions.

=== Geopolitical leverage ===
The influence of global swing states is heightened by their ability to balance between major powers. This leverage is evident in their transactional foreign policies, where they often play one superpower against another to maximize their national interests. For example, India's involvement in the Quad enhances its strategic positioning vis-à-vis China, while Brazil and Indonesia benefit from Chinese investment in critical minerals.

=== Climate policy influence ===
These states also hold significant sway in international climate policy. Brazil and Indonesia are crucial for efforts to combat deforestation, while India and Indonesia are key players in decarbonization initiatives. Programs like the Just Energy Transition Partnership highlight their leadership in financing climate goals, with South Africa and Indonesia as notable participants.

=== Impact on the Russia–Ukraine War ===
Global swing states have notably influenced the international response to the Russian invasion of Ukraine. Their refusal to align fully with Western sanctions on Russia demonstrates their independent stance and highlights their role in mediating global conflicts. Turkey, in particular, has emerged as a crucial mediator, facilitating grain deals and peace talks.

== Countries ==
Several countries are frequently identified as global swing states due to their ability to influence global affairs. These include:

=== Brazil ===
Brazil is a key player in Latin America and an influential member of BRICS. Its vast natural resources, large economy, and active participation in global forums, such as the United Nations and the G20, underscore its importance. Brazil's foreign policy often emphasizes multipolarity and non-alignment, allowing it to engage with various global powers while prioritizing regional stability and economic growth.

=== India ===
India is one of the fastest-growing major economies and a pivotal player in the Indo-Pacific region. Its strategic location, democratic governance, and military capabilities make it a crucial partner for both the United States and China. India's foreign policy is characterized by strategic autonomy, as seen in its participation in various multilateral forums such as the Quadrilateral Security Dialogue and BRICS.

=== Indonesia ===
Indonesia, the largest economy in Southeast Asia, plays a significant role in regional politics and global maritime security. Its strategic location along vital sea lanes and its growing economic power make it an essential player in Asia-Pacific geopolitics. Indonesia's foreign policy is based on a principle of "free and active" diplomacy, allowing it to engage with multiple global powers while maintaining its independence.

=== Saudi Arabia ===
Saudi Arabia's influence stems from its vast oil reserves, significant financial resources, and strategic location in the Middle East. As a leading member of OPEC and a key player in the Islamic world, Saudi Arabia holds considerable sway in global energy markets and regional politics. Its recent foreign policy initiatives have included diversifying its alliances and engaging in regional diplomacy.

=== South Africa ===
South Africa is a prominent actor in Africa and an influential member of BRICS. Its democratic institutions, robust economy, and strategic position make it a key player in regional and global affairs. South Africa's foreign policy emphasizes multilateralism and regional integration, often serving as a bridge between the Global South and developed countries.

=== Turkey ===
Turkey's strategic location at the crossroads of Europe and Asia, its substantial military capabilities, and its active role in regional conflicts make it a significant player in global politics. Turkey's foreign policy is characterized by its pursuit of strategic autonomy, balancing relationships with the United States, EU, Russia, and China.

== Geopolitical implications and strategies ==
=== Fragmentation of the global order ===
The increasing fragmentation of the global order is evident in the diverging approaches to international cooperation and governance. The world is becoming more multipolar, with significant blocs led by the United States and China. This fragmentation is reflected in the dysfunction of traditional international institutions like the World Trade Organization and the United Nations Security Council, which struggle to address contemporary challenges effectively.

=== Sino-American competition ===
The strategic competition between the United States and China has profound implications for global swing states. These countries often find themselves in a position to leverage this rivalry to their advantage, engaging in transactional diplomacy to extract concessions and benefits from both powers.

=== Regionalization ===
The trend toward regionalization has gained momentum, with more than half of international trade, investment, and the movement of people occurring within regions. Global swing states are increasingly seeking regional arrangements to reduce dependence on global powers and enhance their strategic autonomy.

=== Strategic diversification ===
Many swing states are adopting strategies of strategic diversification, deepening ties with multiple global powers to avoid over-reliance on any single country. This approach allows them to navigate the complexities of great-power competition while pursuing their national interests.

== See also ==
- De-hyphenation
- Multi-alignment
- Belt and Road Initiative – Chinese global infrastructure project
- East–West dichotomy – Perceived difference between the Eastern and Western worlds
- Emerging power – Nation or block with steadily rising influence in world affairs
- G7 – Intergovernmental political and economic forum
- Non-Aligned Movement – Group of countries not in major power blocs
- Power transition theory – Theory regarding international relations and war

== Bibliography ==
- Swielande, Tanguy Struye de; Vandamme, Dorothée (23 December 2015), Power in the 21st Century: Determinants and Contours, Presses universitaires de Louvain, ISBN 978-2-87558-426-7
