= Annette Beck-Sickinger =

German biochemist

Annette Gabriele Beck-Sickinger
- Born: Annette Gabriele Beck-Sickinger; 28 October 1960 (age 66)
- Education: University of Tübingen
- Known for: GPCR research, peptide hormones, peptide and protein modification
- Scientific career
- Workplaces: University of Leipzig
- Website: www.saw-leipzig.de/de/mitglieder/becka; biochemie.biphaps.uni-leipzig.de/en/groups/biochemistry-and-bioorganic-chemistry/

Annette Gabriele Beck-Sickinger (born 28 October 1960 in Aalen) is a German chemist and biologist. She has been a full professor of Biochemistry and Bioorganic Chemistry at the University of Leipzig since 1999.

== Career ==
Annette G. Beck-Sickinger studied chemistry and biology at the University of Tübingen (Germany) and received her Ph.D. under the supervision of Günther Jung (Organic Chemistry, University of Tübingen) in 1989. After completing her doctorate, she undertook several research fellowships, including stays in the United States and Denmark. Following a postdoctoral fellowship in Zürich, she earned her habilitation in 1995, also in Tübingen. From 1996 to 1999, she served as an assistant professor of pharmaceutical biochemistry at ETH Zürich.

In 1999, she accepted a position as a full professor of Biochemistry and Bioorganic Chemistry at the University of Leipzig. In 2009 and 2014, she was a visiting professor at Vanderbilt University (Nashville, TN).

Annette Beck-Sickinger was a member of the Board of the German Chemical Society (Gesellschaft Deutscher Chemiker, 2004–2012; Vice-president 2006–2008) and of the DFG panel "Biochemistry" (2004–2012). She has been a full member of the Saxon Academy of Sciences since 2009, of the German Academy of Sciences Leopoldina (Chemistry Section) since 2012, and of the Lower Saxon Academy of Sciences in Göttingen since 2021. In 2010, she was elected to the University Council of the University of Leipzig; from 2014 to 2020, she served on the University Council of the University of Stuttgart-Hohenheim, which she chaired from 2018 to 2021. From 2017 to 2023, she served as a member of the Board of the German Society for Biochemistry and Molecular Biology (gbm) and was vice-president from 2019 to 2021. She was a member of the German Council of Science and Humanities (Wissenschaftsrat) from 2012 to 2018.

Since 2021, Beck-Sickinger has been a member of the Senate of the German Research Foundation (DFG). In 2026, she was appointed a founding member of the FEBS Research Academy.

She has served and continues to serve on numerous boards, including the Board of the German "Verbandes der Chemischen Industrie", the Leibniz Institute for Catalysis e. V. (LIKAT) in Rostock, the Advisory Board of the Carl Zeiss Foundation, and the International Scientific Advisory Board of the University of Basel’s Faculty of Pharmaceutical Sciences, and chairs the International Advisory Board of Angewandte Chemie.

In addition, Beck-Sickinger serves on various award and selection committees, such as those of the German Chemical Society (GDCh), the Society for Biochemistry and Molecular Biology (GBM), the Federation of European Biochemical Societies (FEBS), as well as for various foundations, e.g., the Boehringer Ingelheim Prize and the Life Science Bridge Award.

Beck-Sickinger supervised numerous early-career researchers from a wide variety of countries, including Italy, India, Spain, Denmark, and Pakistan; 93 doctoral dissertations were completed under her guidance by 2026. She also served as a mentor for 5 habilitation candidates and junior professors.

== Prizes ==
She has been awarded with many prizes including the Leonidas Zervas Award of the European Peptide Society, the gold medal of the Max-Bergmann-Kreis, the Leipzig Science Award (2016) and the Albrecht Kossel Price of the German Chemical Society (2018). She was honoured with the membership of the Saxonian Academy of Science in 2009 and in 2012 became an elected member of the German National Academy of Sciences Leopoldina. In 2017, she was awarded with the Saxonian Order of Merit. In 2019, Beck-Sickinger received the Vincent du Vigneaud Award from the American Peptide Society, and for the 2018–2019 period, she was awarded the Chemistry Europe Fellow Award. She received the Richard Willstätter Prize for Chemical Biology (Dechema, GDCh, GBM) in 2023. In 2023, IUPAC recognized her as one of the world’s most prominent female scientists in the fields of chemistry and chemical engineering. In 2025, Beck-Sickinger was honored by the Federation of European Biochemical Societies (FEBS) with the Sir Hans Krebs Medal & Lecture, and in 2026, she received the Viktor Mutt Award from the International Society of Neuropeptides.

== Research ==
She is known for her work on peptide signaling, ligand-receptor interactions, especially of neuropeptides, their downstream signal transduction processes, and the chemical modification of peptides and proteins for diagnostic and therapeutic applications. She is the author of several biochemistry textbooks and has published numerous papers (>430 listed in PubMed; Google Scholar h-index 82, total citations >25,000). She has coauthored reference works on combinatorial chemistry as applied to peptides and has participated in International Union of Pharmacology projects on standardization of nomenclature for G protein-coupled receptor peptide ligands.

From 2002 to 2012, she served as spokesperson for Collaborative Research Center 610 (“Protein States with Cell Biological and Medical Relevance”). She was involved in Transregio 67 (“Functional Biomaterials for Controlling Healing Processes in Bone and Skin Tissue—From Material to Clinical Application”) from 2009 to 2021 and headed the integrated graduate school “Matrix engineering". From 2013 to 2024, she served as project leader and a member of the executive board of Collaborative Research Center 1052 (“Obesity Mechanisms”). Since early 2020, Annette Beck-Sickinger has been the spokesperson for Collaborative Research Center 1423 (“Structural Dynamics of GPCR Activation and Signal Transduction”), where her work focuses on the interaction of G-protein-coupled receptors (GPCRs) with arrestin, as well as the molecular mechanisms underlying the allosteric modulation of GPCRs by small molecules. The Leipzig Center of Metabolism (LeiCeM) Cluster of Excellence, which has been in operation since 2026, conducts research on and treats common metabolic diseases such as obesity, type 2 diabetes, fatty liver disease, and their complications; Beck-Sickinger contributes with her research in the fields of peptide biochemistry and GPCR signal transduction.

== Controversy ==
In March 2015, Beck-Sickinger was at the center of a controversy related to comments made during correspondence with an internship applicant in which she stated she would not accept any male students from India.

The university declined to publish e-mails between Prof. Dr. Annette Beck-Sickinger and the student from India. However, the rector of the university, Prof. Dr. Beate Schücking as well as the students council of the university had the opportunity to review all relevant e-mails. Two independent statements have been published claiming that the mail published by the Indian student was faked as it only contained parts of the email conversation and that the student was declined for formal reasons.

Germany's ambassador to India wrote a letter condemning Beck-Sickinger and, stating: "Your oversimplifying and discriminating generalisation is an offence to women and men ardently committed to furthering women's empowerment in India; and is an offence to millions of law-abiding, tolerant, open-minded and hard-working Indians. Let's be clear: India is not a country of rapists," he wrote. "I would encourage you to learn more about the diverse, dynamic and fascinating country and the many welcoming and open-minded people of India so that you could correct a simplistic image, which – in my opinion – is particularly unsuitable for a professor and teacher."

== Selected bibliography ==
=== Books ===
- Beck-Sickinger, Annette; Weber, Peter J. A. (1999). Kombinatorische Methoden in Chemie und Biologie. Spektrum Verlag. ISBN 3827401577.
- Beck-Sickinger, Annette; Weber, Peter (2002). Combinatorial strategies in biology and chemistry. Chichester, England New York: Wiley. ISBN 9780471497271.
- Beck-Sickinger, Annette; Hahn, Ulrich (2002). Lehrbuch der Biochemie (Herausgabe der deutschen Übersetzung von Voet, Voet, Pratt; Principles in Biochemistry). Wiley. ISBN 352730519X.
- Beck-Sickinger, Annette; Bräse, Stefan (2007). Combinatorial chemistry on solid supports. Berlin New York: Springer. ISBN 9783540725091.
- Beck-Sickinger, Annette; Petzold, Matthias (2009). Paradigma Evolution. Stuttgart: Peter Lang Verlag. ISBN 978-3631560822.

=== Journal articles ===
- H. Lentschat, F. Liessmann, C. Tydings, T. Schermeng, J. Stichel, N. Urban, M. Schaefer, J. Meiler, A.G. Beck-Sickinger: Hederagenin is a Highly Selective Antagonist of the Neuropeptide FF Receptor 1 that Reveals Mechanisms for Subtype Selectivity. In: Angew Chem Int Ed Engl. 64(6), Feb 2025, e202417786.
- A. Kaiser, J. C. Rojas Echeverri, A. Baischew, M. Pankonin, K. D. Leitner, C. Iacobucci, D. Sala, C. Ihling, R. Müller, R. Ferenc, A.G. Beck-Sickinger, P. Schmidt, J. Meiler, P. W. Hildebrand, A. Sinz. Transient ligand contacts of the intrinsically disordered N-terminus of neuropeptide Y2 receptor regulate arrestin-3 recruitment. In: Nat Commun. 16(1), Sep 2025, 8326.
- A. Kohler, E. M. Jülke, J. Stichel, A.G. Beck-Sickinger. Comparison of Protocols to Test Peptide Stability in Blood Plasma and Cell Culture Supernatants. In: ACS Pharmacol Transl Sci. 7(11), Oct 2024, S.3618-3625.
- T. Tang, C. Hartig, Q. Chen, W. Zhao, A. Kaiser, X. Zhang, H. Zhang, H. Qu, C. Yi, L. Ma, S. Han, Q. Zhao, A.G. Beck-Sickinger und B. Wu. Structural basis for ligand recognition of the neuropeptide Y Y2 receptor. In: Nature Communications 12(1), Feb 2021, 737.
- Z. Yang, S. Han, M. Keller, A. Kaiser, B. J. Bender, M. Bosse, K. Burkert, L. M. Kögler, D. Wifling, G. Bernhardt, N. Plank, T. Littmann, P. Schmidt, C. Yi, B. Li, S. Ye, R. Zhang, B. Xu, D. Larhammar, R. C. Stevens, D. Huster, J. Meiler, Q. Zhao, A.G. Beck-Sickinger, A. Buschauer, B. Wu: Structural basis of ligand binding modes at the neuropeptide Y Y(1) receptor. In: Nature. 556(7702), Apr 2018, S. 520–524.
- L. Wanka, S. Babilon, A. Kaiser, K. Mörl, A.G. Beck-Sickinger: Different mode of arrestin-3 binding at the human Y(1) and Y(2) receptor. Cell Signal. 50, Okt 2018, S. 58–71.
- A. Kaiser, C. Hempel, L. Wanka, M. Schubert, H. E. Hamm, A.G. Beck-Sickinger: G Protein Preassembly Rescues Efficacy of W(6.48) Toggle Mutations in Neuropeptide Y(2) Receptor. In: Mol Pharmacol. 93(4), Apr 2018, S. 387–401.
- J. Lotze, P. Wolf, U. Reinhardt, O. Seitz, K. Mörl, Beck-Sickinger AG: Time-Resolved Tracking of Separately Internalized Neuropeptide Y(2) Receptors by Two-Color Pulse-Chase. In: ACS Chem Biol. 13(3), Mar 2018, S. 618–627.
- M. Schubert, J. Stichel, Y. Du, I. R. Tough, G. Sliwoski, J. Meiler, H. M. Cox, C. D. Weaver, A.G. Beck-Sickinger: Identification and Characterization of the First Selective Y(4) Receptor Positive Allosteric Modulator. In: J Med Chem. 60(17), Sep 2017, S. 7605–7612.
- D. Böhme, J. Krieghoff, Beck-Sickinger AG: Double Methotrexate-Modified Neuropeptide Y Analogues Express Increased Toxicity and Overcome Drug Resistance in Breast Cancer Cells. In: J Med Chem. 59(7), Apr 2016, S. 3409–3417.
- S. Zernia, F. Ott, K. Bellmann-Sickert, R. Frank, M. Klenner, H. G. Jahnke, A. Prager, B. Abel, A. Robitzki, A.G. Beck-Sickinger: Peptide-Mediated Specific Immobilization of Catalytically Active Cytochrome P450 BM3 Variant. In: Bioconjug Chem. 27(4), Apr 2016, S. 1090–1097.
- M. Pagel, R. Hassert, T. John, K. Braun, M. Wießler, B. Abel, Beck-Sickinger AG: Multifunctional Coating Improves Cell Adhesion on Titanium by using Cooperatively Acting Peptides. In: Angew Chem Int Ed Engl. 55(15), Apr 2016, S. 4826–4830.
- V. M. Ahrens, K. B. Kostelnik, R. Rennert, D. Böhme, S. Kalkhof, D. Kosel, L. Weber, M. von Bergen, A.G. Beck-Sickinger: A cleavable cytolysin-neuropeptide Y bioconjugate enables specific drug delivery and demonstrates intracellular mode of action. In: J Control Release. 209, Jul 2015, S. 170–178.
- A. Kaiser, P. Müller, T. Zellmann, H. A. Scheidt, L. Thomas, M. Bosse, R. Meier, J. Meiler, D. Huster, A.G. Beck-Sickinger, P. Schmidt: Unwinding of the C-Terminal Residues of Neuropeptide Y is critical for Y₂ Receptor Binding and Activation. In: Angew Chem Int Ed Engl. 54(25), Jun 2015, S. 7446–7449.
