= University of Kurdistan Hewlêr =

Semiprivate University in Erbil, Kurdistan Region

Coordinates: 36.1812°N 44.0065°E

University of Kurdistan Hewlêr (UKH)
- Zankoy Kurdistan – Hewlêr
- Type: Public, No free admission
- Established: 2006
- Founder: Nechirvan Barzani
- Chancellor: Idris Nechirvan Barzani
- President: Keith Sharp
- Location: Erbil, Kurdistan Region
- Campus: Urban
- Website: www.ukh.edu.krd

The University of Kurdistan Hewlêr (UKH) is an educational institution in Erbil (Kurdish: Hewlêr), the Kurdistan Region of Iraq. UKH is a Public university that was established in 2006. The University of Kurdistan Hewlêr obtained top ranking throughout the Region in 2018.

The University of Kurdistan Hewlêr became the first university in the Kurdistan Region to be accredited Internationally by ASIC in 2018.

The Kurdistan Regional Government's Ministry of Higher Education applauded the University of Kurdistan and its administration in the year 2020 for its remarkable standards and steps taken for higher education reform and its international standards based upon its accreditation by ASIC.

Nechirvan Barzani is the founder of UKH and the former Chancellor. Dr.Mohammed Mochtar, also known as Dr.Shamal, has previously served as Vice Chancellor of the University of Kurdistan Hewlêr On 29 May 2011, by invitation of Baban, UKH granted an Honorary Doctorate in Politics and International Relations to John Major, the former British prime minister (1991–1997) who had been very helpful to the Kurds during his term in office. In his speech, he described students of UKH as a "rare asset".

== Gallery ==
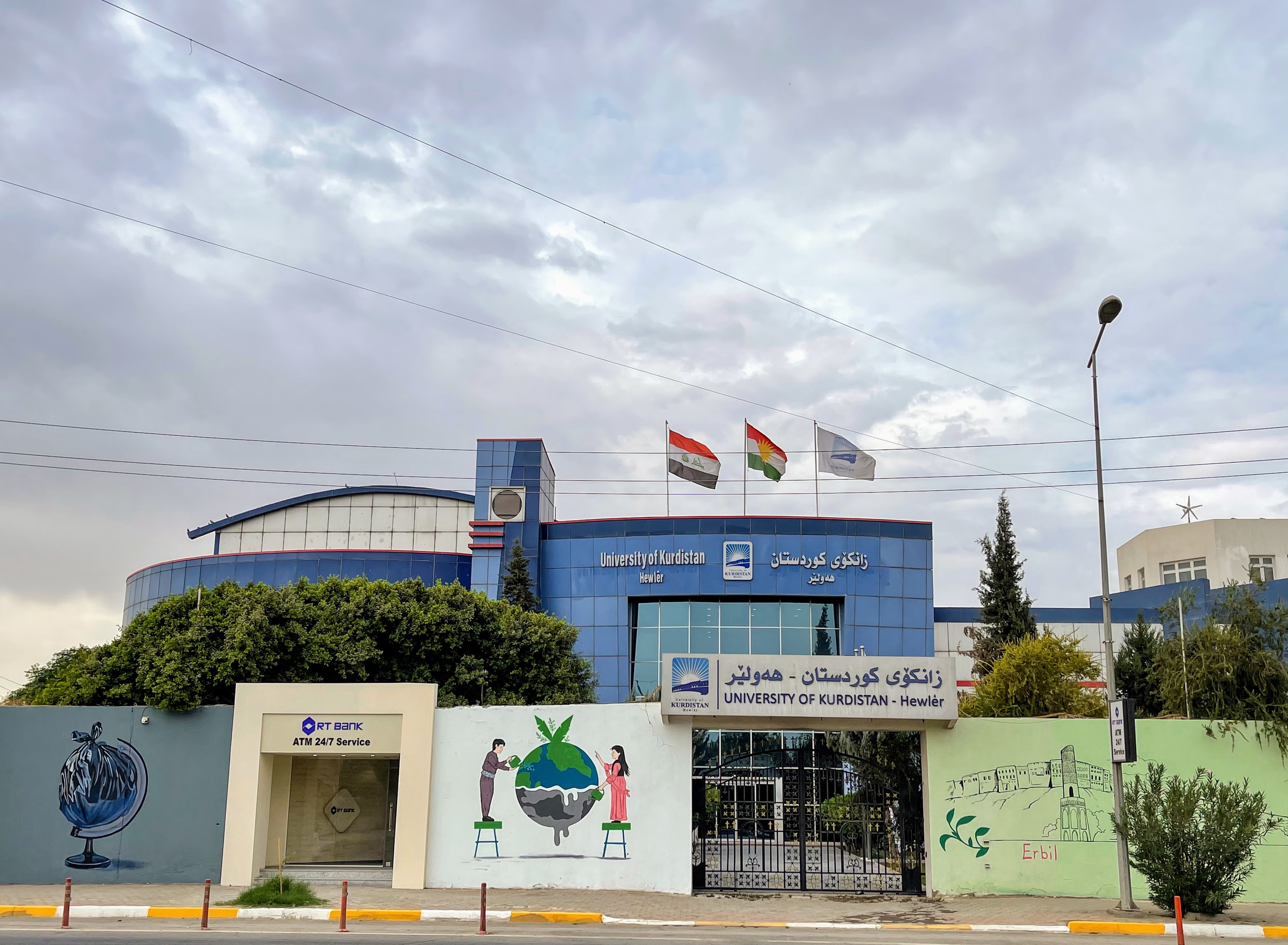
UKH building

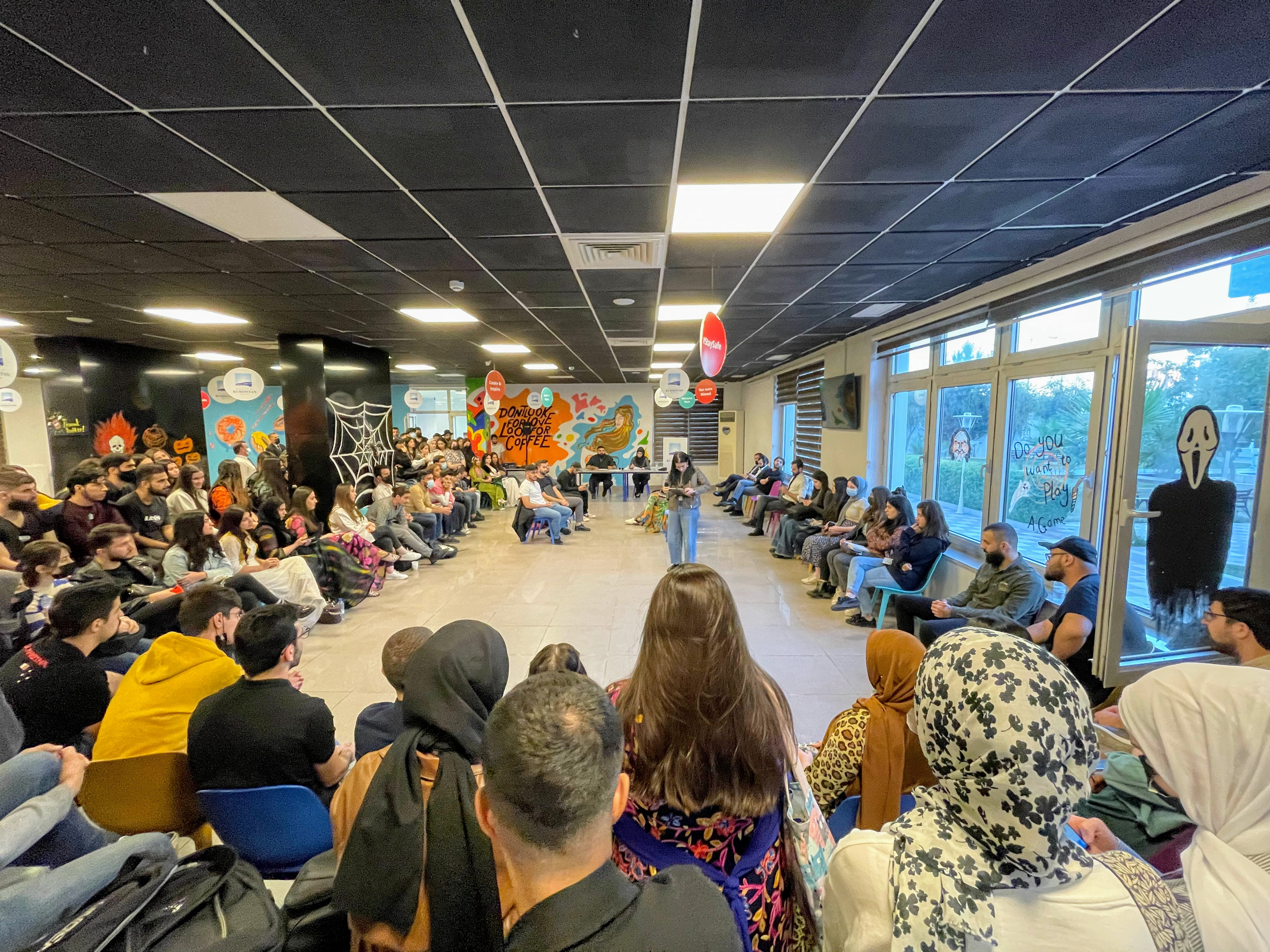
A picture from weekly debate at UKH

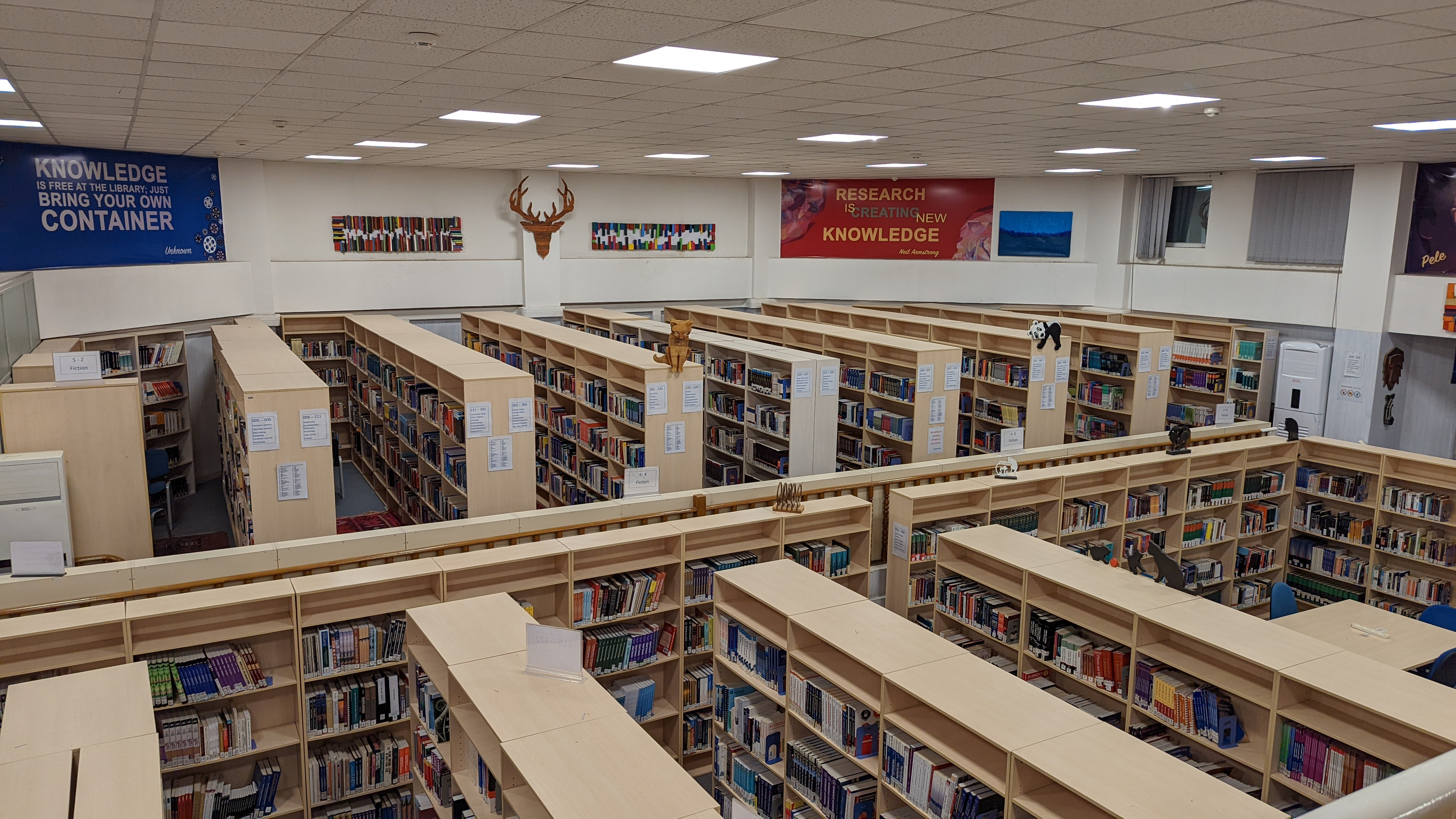
UKH library

== See also ==
- List of universities in Iraq
