= Germany–India relations =

- India: Germany

Diplomatic mission
- Embassy of India, Berlin: Embassy of Germany, New Delhi

Envoy
- Indian Ambassador to Germany Ajit Gupte: German Ambassador to India Jasper Wieck

Bilateral relations between the Republic of India and Federal Republic of Germany have been traditionally strong due to strong cultural, commercial and technological co-operation.

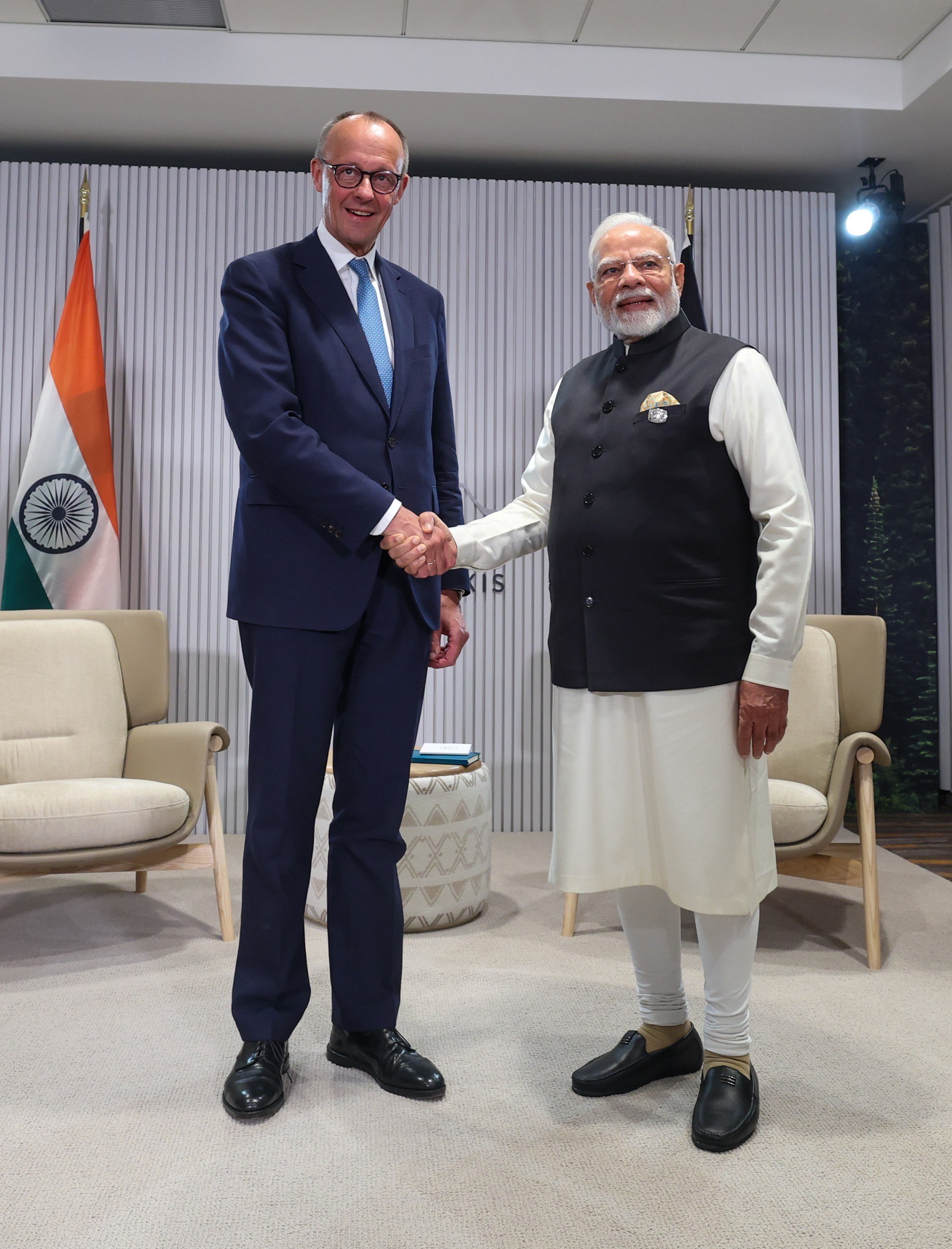
Prime Minister of India Narendra Modi and Chancellor of Germany Friedrich Merz

== History ==
=== Historic relations ===
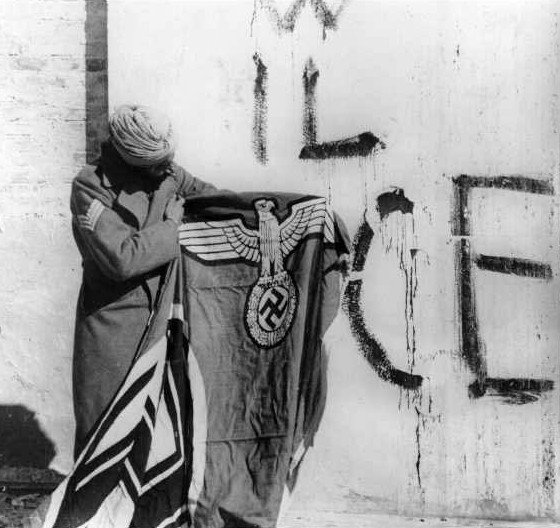
A Sikh soldier (of the 4th Division (the Red Eagles) of the Indian Army, attached to the British Fifth Army in Italy) holding a captured swastika flag after the surrender of Nazi German forces in Italy. Behind him, fascist inscriptions on the mural says VIVA IL DUCE, "Long live the Duke" (Benito Mussolini). Photo circa May 1945.

In 1407 CE, Romani people, believed to be of Indian origin, were recorded living in Germany; within ten years they are expelled.

In the 19th and early 20th centuries, several German scholars made significant contributions to the exploration of Indian culture and the study of Sanskrit, working on the foundations laid by people like Heinrich Roth and Johann Ernst Hanxleden.

One of the most prominent figures was Max Müller (1823–1900), a German philologist and Orientalist. He edited the 50-volume series Sacred Books of the East, bringing Indian and eastern texts to a western audience. Franz Bopp made groupbreaking contributions to Indo-European studies. Other important 19th century German Indologists where Albrecht Weber, Hermann Oldenberg, Friedrich Schlegel and Georg Bühler. Indology became an important academic discipline in German universities, and Indian thought had its influences on German philosophy, with Indomania developing in some circles.

During World War I, India was ruled as an empire by the British monarch as the Emperor of India. Consequently, the Indian Army was ordered to contribute soldiers to the Allied war effort, including on the Western Front. Pro-independence activists within the colonial armies sought German assistance in procuring India's freedom, resulting in the Hindu–German Conspiracy during World War I.

During World War II, the Allied war effort mobilized 2.5 million volunteer troops from India. The Indian Congress Party supported the British declaration of war on Germany in September 1939. Subhas Chandra Bose, a prominent Indian independence activist, refused to accept cooperation with the British government and made a determined effort to obtain India's independence from Britain by seeking military assistance from the Axis powers. The Indische Legion was formed to serve as a liberation force for India and was principally made up of Indian PoWs and expatriates in Europe. After India became independent in 1947, Germany was considered an enemy state under Indian law. On March 7, 1951, this situation came to an end, as the government of India and the government of West Germany established diplomatic relations.

The book Mein Kampf by Nazi leader Adolf Hitler has remained popular in India even in the 21st century. Some early Hindu nationalists saw Fascism as an inspiration.

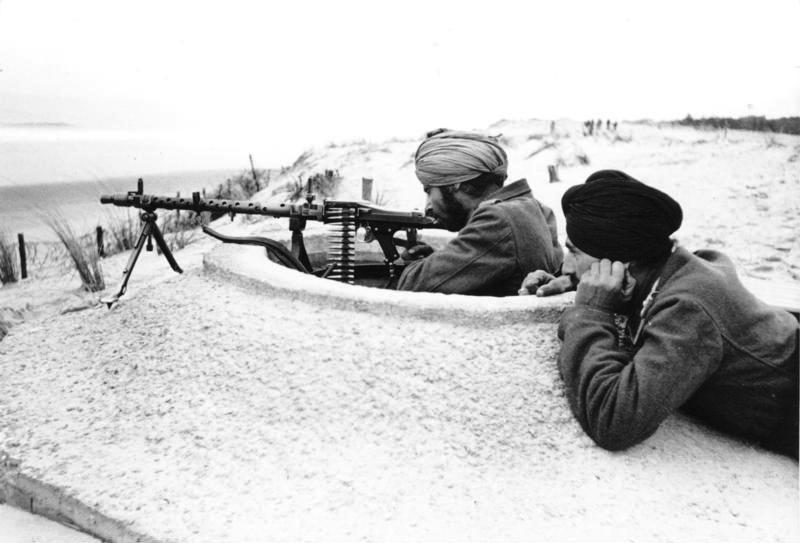
Sikh MG-34 machine gunners of the Indische Legion deployed to the Atlantic Wall near Bordeaux, France. (Photo taken on 21 March 1944 by Propagandakompanien der Wehrmacht)

The newly formed Republic of India was one of the first nations to end the State of War with Germany after World War II and did not claim war reparations from Germany although 24,000 soldiers serving in the Indian Army died in the campaign to fight Germany.

India maintained diplomatic relations with both West Germany and East Germany and supported their reunification in 1990.

West Germany condemned India for liberating Goa from Portuguese rule in 1961 and supported Portugal's dictatorial regime under Salazar against India. West Germany was critical of India for intervening in the 1971 Bangladesh Liberation War. West Germany rejected India's 1998 nuclear tests with Chancellor Helmut Kohl saying: "This was the wrong decision for them to take; we do not accept that decision."

=== Strategic ties after the Cold War ===
The India-Germany strategic relationship is limited by the insignificance of German geopolitical influence in Asian affairs. Contrary to France and the UK, Germany has no strategic footprint in Asia.

Over the past decade, Indo-German trade grew in volume but dropped in importance. According to Indian Ministry of Commerce MX data: Total trade between India and Germany was $5.5 billion (3.8% share of Indian trade and ranked 6) in 2004 and $21.6 billion (2.6% share of Indian trade and ranked 9) in 2013. Indian exports to Germany were $2.54 billion (3.99% ranked 6) in 2004 and $7.3 billion (2.41% ranked 10) in 2013. Indian imports from Germany were $2.92 billion (3.73% ranked 6) in 2004 and $14.33 billion (2.92% ranked 10) in 2013.

=== Global geopolitical reordering ===
India and Germany both seek to become permanent members of the United Nations Security Council and have joined with Japan and Brazil to coordinate their efforts via the G4 collective. At the UN General Assembly summit in New York in September 2015, the P5 members of the UNSC dismissed any notion of dilution of their power at the UN's high-table and severely undermined efforts by G4 nations to gain access to the exclusive club. While India maintains that it will continue to demand a permanent seat with veto powers within a reformed UNSC with privileges identical to the P5 nations, it has signalled that strengthening of bilateral economic and political ties with neighbouring countries is the immediate priority. Prevailing consensus within the United Nations that Europe is already over-represented within the UN Security Council, juxtaposed with long-established opposition from within Europe to the German candidature, constitute indomitable obstacles which confront Germany.

== Defence and security ==
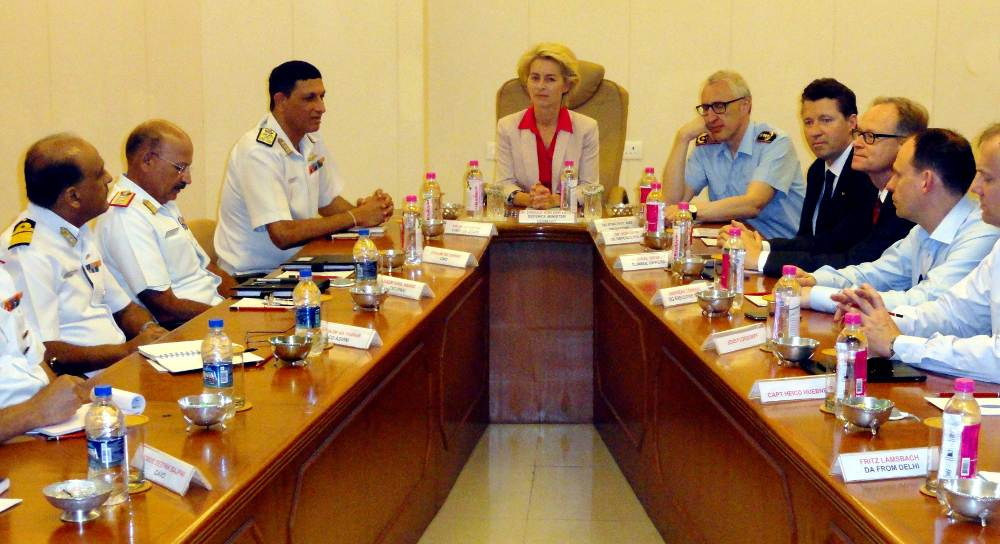
A German delegation led by Defence Minister Ursula von der Leyen interacting with senior officers of the Indian Navy's Western Naval Command in Mumbai; 28 May 2015.

India and Germany maintain an ongoing dialogue in the areas of commercial maritime security and cooperation in the field of anti-terrorism. The Indian Navy and the German Navy conducted joint-exercises in 2008 for the first time, following an anti-piracy co-operation agreement between the two nations signed in 2006.

In 2006 the two countries signed the Bilateral Defence Cooperation Agreement. A followup agreement, the Arrangement on Implementation of the Agreement of 2006 concerning Bilateral Defence Cooperation, was signed in 2019.

Germany's military is principally structured to defend Eastern Europe and to supporting NATO operations in the Western European theatre of operations. Unlike UK and France, Germany not only does not have any sovereign territories in the Indo-Pacific region but is also incapable of power projection.

Hostile public sentiment in Germany towards overseas combat operations and the inability of Germany to independently sustain high-intensity long-range military deployments are obstacles to a meaningful strategic defense and security relationship.

The MP5 submachine gun is used by Indian special forces.

As part of Germany's strategic transformation and strengthening of cooperation in the Indo-Pacific region, Germany's ThyssenKrupp AG and India's Mazagon Dock Shipbuilders signed a memorandum of understanding to jointly bid for the construction of submarine for the Indian Navy. German Defense Minister Boris Pistorius has stressed that India's continued reliance on Russian weapons is not in Germany's interest, he also acknowledging that "Germany cannot change (India's reliance on Russian weapons) on our own". In 2025, Rheinmetall and Reliance Defence came together in the field of ammunition manufacturing. Reliance has also tied up with Diehl Defence. Germany's Hensoldt has partnered with Indian firms (such as Samtel Avionics) in the area of radar, sensor, and avionics technologies.

In the first half of 2024, India was the third largest importer of the German defense sector. Germany is fifth among India's defense suppliers.

In 2024, Germany participated in the first edition of Exercise Tarang Shakti. The German Air Force contingent consisted of five Eurofighter Typhoon and an A400M Atlas, which is the largest deployment of German air assets in an exercise as well as their first deployment to a millitary exercise in India. One of the jets was piloted by Lieutenant General Ingo Gerhartz, the Chief of the German Air Force, who flew five hours straight to the Sulur Air Force Station.

In 2024, India and Germany signed a mutual legal assistance treaty. In 2015 Germany had refused to sign the treaty.

In April 2026, Germany and India signed a Defence Industrial Cooperation Roadmap. The two countries have agreed to coordinate in the area of United Nations peacekeeping training.

== Cultural and educational cooperation ==
Germany has supported education and cultural programmes in India. Germany helped establish the Indian Institute of Technology Madras after both governments signed an agreement in 1956 and increased its co-operation and supply of technology and resources over the decades to help expand the institution.

In the late 1960s, German aircraft designer Kurt Tank, who worked for Focke-Wulf during World War II, went to work in India. Kurt was first employed as the Director of the Madras Institute of Technology, and later joined Hindustan Aeronautics, where he designed the Hindustan Marut fighter-bomber, the first military aircraft constructed in India. Kurt Tank left Hindustan Aeronautics in 1967 and by the 1970s had returned to live in Berlin.

Both nations established the Indo-German Science and Technology Centre in New Delhi to promote joint research and development in energy, environment, coal and water technologies.

India and Germany have signed a MoU regarding the teaching of German language in Kendriya Vidyalaya public schools in India and the reciprocal introduction of Sanskrit and modern Indian language in government schools in Germany.

Starting from 1999, several German educational institutions have relied on satellite launch services provided by ISRO. DLR-Tubsat, BIRD, Rubin-8, Compass-1, Rubin-9A, Rubin-9B, BeeSat, UWE-2 & AISAT were all successfully launched using the Polar Satellite Launch Vehicle.

As of 2025/26 just under 70,000 Indian students are in German universities making Indians the largest group of international students in Germany. In 2024, 60% of Indian students in Germany took up engineering including biology related fields, followed by social sciences, economics and management at 21%, and mathematics and natural sciences at 18%. Reasons for choosing Germany, as compared to other countries traditionally chosen by Indian students, includes high-quality affordable education and clearer post-education job opportunities.

== Trade and investment ==
Stiff competition between foreign manufactured goods within the Indian market has seen machine-tools, automotive parts and medical supplies from German Mittelstand ceding ground to high-technology imports manufactured by companies located in ASEAN and BRICS countries.

For the 2012-2013 (April–July) period, India's top 10 trading partners according to data published by the Indian Ministry of Commerce:

Rank	Country	Total Trade bn US$	Trade Share %
1	China	49.5	8.7
2	United States	46.0	8.1
3	United Arab Emirates (UAE)	45.4	8.0
4	Saudi Arabia	36.3	6.4
5	Switzerland	16.7	2.9
6	Iraq	15.5	2.7
7	Singapore	15.4	2.7
8	Indonesia	14.8	2.6
9	Germany	14.7	2.6
10	Hong Kong	14.6	2.6

According to German Statistisches Bundesamt Indo-German trade data for 2014 : total trade with India was €15.98 billion (ranked 25) with €1.86 billion trade balance in Germany's favour. German exports to India was €8.92 billion (ranked 25), German imports from India was €7.06 billion (ranked 27). By 2023, total trade had grown to €30.8 billion (ranked 23) with €2.19 billion trade balance in Germany's favour.

Germany is India's largest trading partner in Europe. Germany is the 8th largest foreign direct investor (FDI) in India. Germany's FDI totaled about US$5.2 billion during the period 2000–2012, constituting about 3% of total FDI to India. Indian investments in Germany have seen sharp increase in last few years. (Note: As a measure of comparison, Remittances to India by the Indian diaspora worldwide was US$70 billion in 2013–14).

Indian Prime-Minister Narendra Modi jointly opened the Hannover trade fair Hannover Messe 2015 on 12 April 2015 along with Angela Merkel and held trade & investment discussions with German Chancellor Angela Merkel in Berlin.

In September 2015, Automotive Research Association of India (ARAI) was instructed by the Indian government to investigate if vehicles from Volkswagen had circumvented Indian laws and regulations on vehicle emission testing following the Volkswagen emissions scandal. Ambuj Sharma, additional secretary at the Ministry of Heavy Industry, said: "ARAI has been asked to submit its report within a week."

=== Bilateral trade ===
German imports from India amounted to $9.51 billion or 2.26% of India's overall exports in 2021. The 10 major commodities exported from India to Germany were:

1. Machinery, nuclear reactors, boilers: $1.31 billion
2. Electrical, electronic equipment: $913.61 million
3. Organic chemicals: $833.80 million
4. Articles of apparel, knit or crocheted: $547.51 million
5. Vehicles other than railway, tramway: $498.97 million
6. Articles of iron or steel: $429.93 million
7. Articles of apparel, not knit or crocheted: $351.58 million
8. Pharmaceutical products: $316.05 million
9. Rubbers: $310.42 million
10. Articles of leather, animal gut, harness, travel good: $281.66 million

German exports to India amounted to $13.3 billion or 2.17% of India's overall imports in 2019. The 10 major commodities exported from Germany to India were:

1. Machinery, nuclear reactors, boilers: $3.75 billion
2. Aircraft, spacecraft: $2.20 billion
3. Electrical, electronic equipment: $1.51 billion
4. Optical, photo, technical, medical apparatus: $1.22 billion
5. Plastics: $635.46 million
6. Organic chemicals: $590.91 million
7. Vehicles other than railway, tramway: $513.42 million
8. Miscellaneous chemical products: $469.05 million
9. Iron and steel: $346.54 million
10. Pharmaceutical products: $329.49 million

Bilateral trade in goods and services amounted to US$51.23 billion in 2024-25, with Germany remaining India’s largest trading partner within the European Union and accounting for about one-fourth of India’s total trade with the EU. Trade in services grew by 12.5 percent during the year, reaching a record US$16.65 billion.

== Development cooperation ==
Germany has been providing development aid to India since the 1950s. With German support, the steel plant in Rourkela was built in the 1950s. Germany also helped with agricultural modernization and the Green Revolution in India. Both countries cooperate in the Indo-German Energy Forum since 2006 for the funding of energy projects. Priority areas are renewable energies and energy efficiency.

In 2022, Germany provided India with development aid amounting to almost 987 million euros. Focus areas are poverty reduction and environmental protection. In 2022, Germany pledged 10 billion euros to India for the expansion of renewable energy by 2030.

In May 2022 both countries agreed to work on development projects in third-world countries (Triangular Development Cooperation).

== Migration ==
Indians are one of the fastest growing groups of foreigners in Germany. The number of Indian migrants in Germany has risen sharply in recent years. In 2022, there were around 210,000 Indian citizens living in Germany, up from less than 100,000 in 2016. By 2026 the Indian diaspora in Germany had increased to 322,000.

In the 1950s and 1960s, many Indian men came to Germany to study, most of them in engineering. Some of them returned to India, most of them stayed in Germany to work. In the late 1960s, many Catholic Malayali women from Kerala were brought to Germany by German Catholic institutions. They mostly worked as nurses in hospitals. In 1970 there were around 8000 Indians in Germany.

At the beginning of the new millennium, the Schröder government introduced a special German Green Card for Indian IT workers. In 2022, the two countries concluded a migration agreement that makes it easier for Indian skilled workers to immigrate to Germany. The migration and mobility agreement was signed to make it easier for Indians to enter Germany to work, study or begin training in the country. Waiting times and the bureaucratic burden of visa applications will be reduced. The introduction of the EU Blue Card in Germany in 2012 resulted in a significant increase in Indian migration.

According to a 2024 study by Bertelsmann Stiftung the German economy needs to bring in 288,000 international workers per year to address labour market and shrinking workforce woes. In a first, Germany has released a "Skilled Labour Strategy" for India on 16 October 2024.

== Perceptions ==
=== General public ===
India suffers from a severe image deficit in Germany.

In August 2007, a mob of over 50 persons attacked 8 Indians in Mügeln.

The poor perception of India in Germany can be attributed in part to media coverage of women's rights in India. An example is the gang rape on a bus in New Delhi in 2012, which made international headlines at the time.

This can be seen as the pretext for a case from 2015 in which Professor Annette Beck-Sickinger, the head of the biochemistry department at Leipzig University, caused a furore in India by rejecting an internship application from an Indian student as a retaliation against India's 'culture of rape' and alluding to the existence of a wider Europe-wide boycott of Indian male students. The racial profiling, gender discrimination and xenophobic undertones of the incident placed the spotlight on prevalent institutional bias, increasing intolerance to foreigners and level of respect for the human rights of persons of color in Germany. Indians have been deeply critical of the German institutional approach to the 2015 Leipzig University internship affair and the absence of sanctions against professor Annette Beck-Sickinger. The Leipzig University internship controversy, occurred just weeks before the April 2015 official visit to Germany by Indian Prime-Minister Narendra Modi at the invitation of German Chancellor Angela Merkel.

Despite this, the number of Indian students at German universities rose after 2015 and stood at 42,578 in 2023, overtaking Chinese students.

=== BBC World Service Country Rating Poll data for Germany and India ===
According to a 2014 BBC World Service Poll, 32% of Indians view Germany's influence positively, 42% neutral and 26% expressing a negative view, while only 16% of Germans view India's influence positively, 16% neutral and 68% expressing a negative view. Both countries view of each other is at the lower end of the poll charts by the BBC.

Results of 2014 BBC World Service poll. Views of India's influence by country Sorted by positive - negative
Country polled	Positive	Negative	Neutral	Pos-neg
Germany	16	68	16	-52
Pakistan	21	58	21	-37
Spain	20	50	30	-30
Israel	9	34	57	-25
Mexico	26	37	37	-11
South Korea	36	47	17	-11
France	40	49	11	-9
China	27	35	38	-8
Canada	38	46	16	-8
Peru	26	31	43	-5
Australia	44	46	10	-2
United Kingdom	45	46	9	-1
Brazil	41	36	23	5
Turkey	35	29	36	6
Chile	35	21	44	14
Indonesia	47	24	29	23
Japan	34	9	57	25
Kenya	53	23	24	30
Ghana	53	22	25	31
India	56	22	22	34
Russia	45	9	46	36
Nigeria	64	22	14	42

=== Pew Research Center Study ===
According to the report published by Pew Research Center in August 2023, 47% Germans viewed India favourably with 38% viewing it as unfavourable and 15% voting as "don't know/refused". The favourable views on India have declined from 2007 when 60% of Germans surveyed viewed India favourably.

Results of 2014 BBC World Service poll. Views of Germany's influence by country Sorted by positive - negative
Country polled	Positive	Negative	Neutral	Pos-neg
Israel	25	38	37	-13
Spain	44	40	16	4
India	32	26	42	6
Pakistan	35	27	38	8
China	42	22	36	20
Mexico	45	24	31	21
Peru	44	22	34	22
Turkey	47	24	29	23
Indonesia	53	28	19	25
Chile	47	18	35	29
Nigeria	63	23	14	40
Japan	46	3	51	43
Kenya	58	15	27	43
Russia	57	12	31	45
Brazil	66	21	13	45
Germany	68	19	13	49
Ghana	72	13	15	59
Canada	77	10	13	67
France	83	11	6	72
United Kingdom	86	9	5	77
South Korea	84	6	10	78
Australia	86	7	7	79

== Diplomatic exchanges ==
=== Official visits by German presidents and chancellors ===
Chancellor of Germany Helmut Kohl visited India in 1986 and 1993.

Starting with German Chancellor Gerhard Schröder visiting India in 2001, annual meetings took place between the two countries.

In 2008, German Chancellor Angela Merkel made an official visit to India that led to the signing of several agreements expanding bilateral co-operation in commerce, science, technology and defence.

Every two years since 2011 Indo-German intergovernmental consultations (IGC) have been held; this is a unique mode of dialouge for India. In 2013, German Chancellor Angela Merkel led a German delegation which included German Federal Ministers of Transport, Building & Urban Development, Interior, Defence, Education & Research, Parliamentary State Secretary for Environment, Nature Conservation, and Nuclear safety; to the Second India-Germany Intergovernmental Consultations in New Delhi.

On 4 October 2015, German Chancellor Angela Merkel travelled to India for the Third Indo-German Inter-Governmental Consultations accompanied by several members of her government (Minister for Foreign Affairs Frank-Walter Steinmeier, Science & Technology Minister Johanna Wanka, Minister for Economic Cooperation and Development Gerd Müller, Food and Agriculture Minister Christian Schmidt) and a contingent of business leaders. The visit, announced by the German embassy in India as a turning point in Indo-German relations,

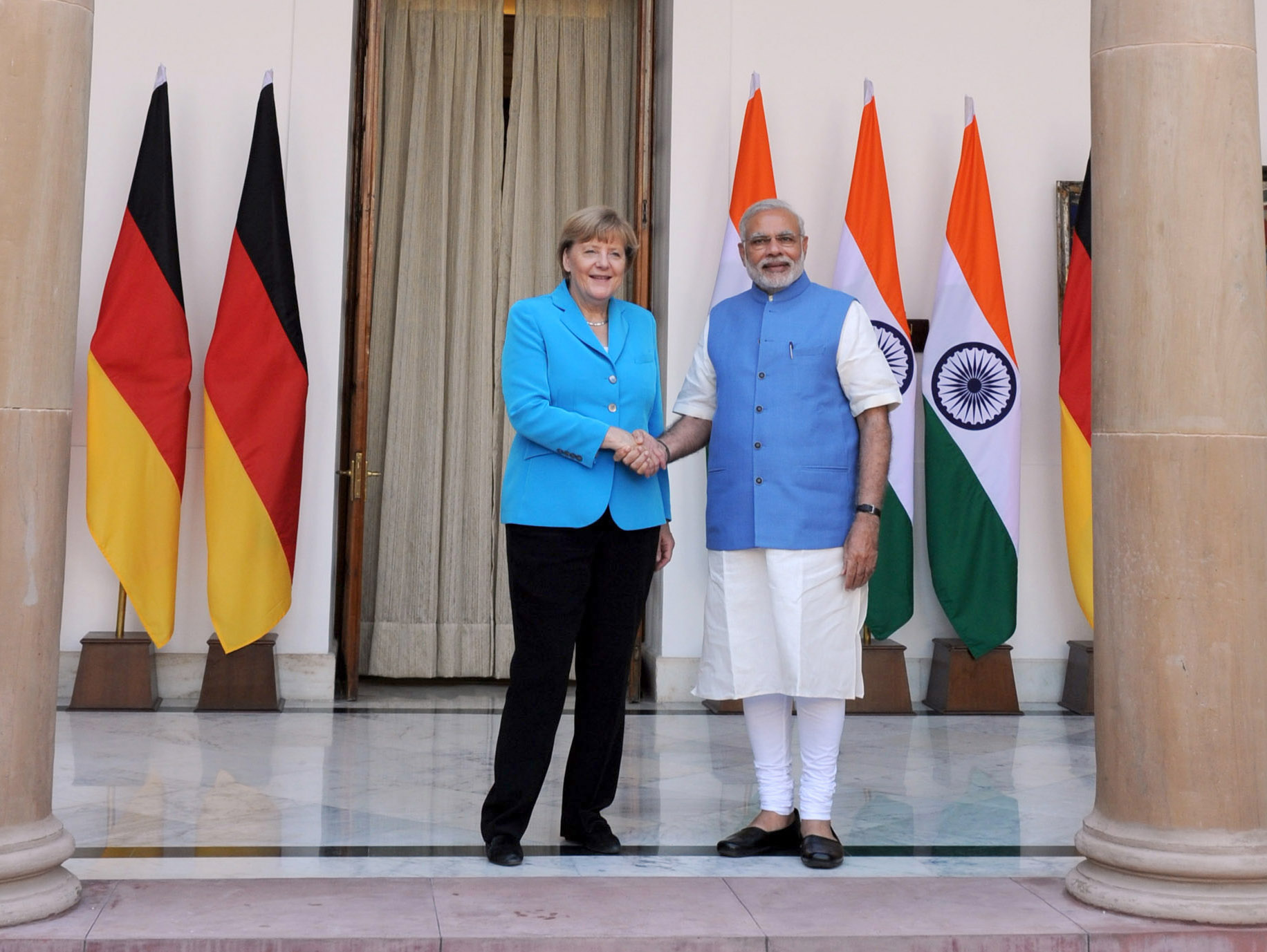
Narendra Modi with Angela Merkel in New Delhi, India on 5 October 2015

On 5 October 2015, Angela Merkel visited Mahatma Gandhi's memorial at Raj Ghat and was accorded a ceremonial welcome at the Presidential Palace prior to the Third Indo-German Inter-Governmental Consultations which led to the signing of 18 Memorandums of Understanding (MoU). Germany returned a 10th-century relic, a statue of the Hindu goddess Durga in her Mahishasuramardini avatar, which had been stolen from India.

On 6 October 2015, Prime Minister Narendra Modi held trade discussions on Indo-German science, technology & education cooperation with Angela Merkel in Bengaluru, India's aerospace and ICT hub, besides exploring opportunities to improve bilateral trade. Merkel and Modi toured the vocational training facilities and innovation centre of Robert Bosch. Bosch entered India in 1922, when Illies & Company set up a sales office in Calcutta. Currently, Bosch India has a turnover of over $3 billion and over 31,000 employees spread across 10 locations and 7 application development centers. 84% of Bosch India revenues come from its automotive business, with the remaining 16% split between its non-automotive businesses that include packaging, energy and building solutions, power tools and consumer retail Bosch India is listed on the Indian stock exchanges and has a market capitalization of over $12 billion. Angela Merkel's 3-day official visit to India concluded after the two leaders attended a business & technology forum hosted by NASSCOM and Fraunhofer Society where Merkel said: "India needs jobs, Germany needs people and collaboration is crucial to meet the demographic needs of both countries", and opined that the advantages for German companies in India are its huge market, a great growth potential and an impressive capacity for innovation.

Foremost newspapers in both Germany and India focussed primarily on the trade and investment aspects of the visit. Germany's State broadcaster Deutsche Welle eloquently captured the prevailing mood regarding the visit with its editorial titled:"A first step in the right direction – no more, no less". Indian Express in an editorial titled "She came and went" pondered over the modest nature of agreements announced during the visit and placed the onus on India to raise its attractiveness as a partner through concrete socio-economic progress and improvements in bilateral relations in India's immediate neighbourhood. The Hindu termed the visit as a dosis realitaet reality-check for Merkel and Modi.

The fifth IGC was held in New Delhi in November 2019.

German Chancellor Olaf Scholz visited India on 25 February 2023. In a joint statement, both countries agreed to enhance their cooperation on innovation and technology.

From 12–13 January 2026, Chancellor Friedrich Merz visited India. During his visit to Gujarat, he paid homage at Sabarmati Ashram, participated in the International Kite Festival, held delegation-level talks with PM Modi at Mahatma Mandir, and visited Dandi Kutir, a museum dedicated to Mahatma Gandhi. He later traveled to Bengaluru, where he visited Bosch’s Adugodi campus and the IIsc Centre for Nano Science and Engineering, highlighting Indo-German cooperation in manufacturing, innovation, and advanced research. About 19 MoUs and joint declarations were announced, including visa-free airport transit for Indians, along with declarations of intent on an India-Germany Semiconductor Ecosystem Partnership and cooperation in critical minerals. The leaders condemned terrorism in all forms, including cross-border terrorism and the Pahalgam attack, committed to enhanced cooperation against terrorist entities under the UN 1267 sanctions regime, welcomed the ratification of the Mutual Legal Assistance Treaty, and noted progress under the Joint Working Group on Counter-Terrorism.

The 7th India-Germany Inter-Governmental Consultations (IGC) were held in New Delhi in October 2024.

=== Official visits by Indian prime ministers ===
Prime Minister P.V. Narasimha Rao visited Germany in 1991. Prime Minister Atal Bihari Vajpayee visited Germany in 2003. Prime Minister Manmohan Singh visited Germany in 2006, 2007 and 2013. Prime Minister Narendra Modi first visited Germany in 2015. As part of multi-nation tours and summits, Modi visited Germany in 2017 and 2022. The 4th and 6th India Germany Inter-Governmental Consultations (IGC) were held in Berlin in 2017 and 2022.

=== Embassies and Consulates ===
The German embassy in India is located in New Delhi. The embassy of India in Germany is located at Berlin. Consulate Generals of India are located in Frankfurt, Hamburg and Munich.

=== Diplomatic incidents ===
In March 2024, India summoned a German envoy to protest against his government's call on the standards relating to independence of judiciary and basic democratic principles to be applied in the arrest of Indian opposition leader Arvind Kejriwal.

== German organizations in India ==
- German Embassy New Delhi
- German General Consulate Bengaluru
- German General Consulate Chennai
- German General Consulate Kolkata
- German General Consulate Mumbai
- Goethe-Institut Max Mueller Bavan
- German Academic Exchange Service
- Indo-German Chamber of Commerce

There are over 2000 German companies in India.

== Indian organizations in Germany ==
- Indian Embassy Berlin
- Indian General Consulate Munich
- Indian General Consulate Hamburg
- Indian General Consulate Frankfurt

== See also ==
- India–European Union relations
- Hindu–German Conspiracy
- Indians in Germany
- Germans in India
- Indian Ambassadors to the Federal Republic of Germany
- List of ambassadors of Germany to India
