= Collaborative Research Centres =

German long-term basic research projects

Collaborative Research Centres (CRC) or Sonderforschungsbereiche (SFB) are long-term basic research projects paid by the Deutsche Forschungsgemeinschaft (DFG). They can be extended to up to 12 years. In the CRC, scientists from several disciplines of a university or several universities work together. CRCs enable institutions to further develop their research profile and build structures. The universities can also cooperate with non-university research institutions.

== See also ==
- Science and technology in Germany
