= Sushma Swaraj as Minister of External Affairs =

Part of the career of the Indian politician

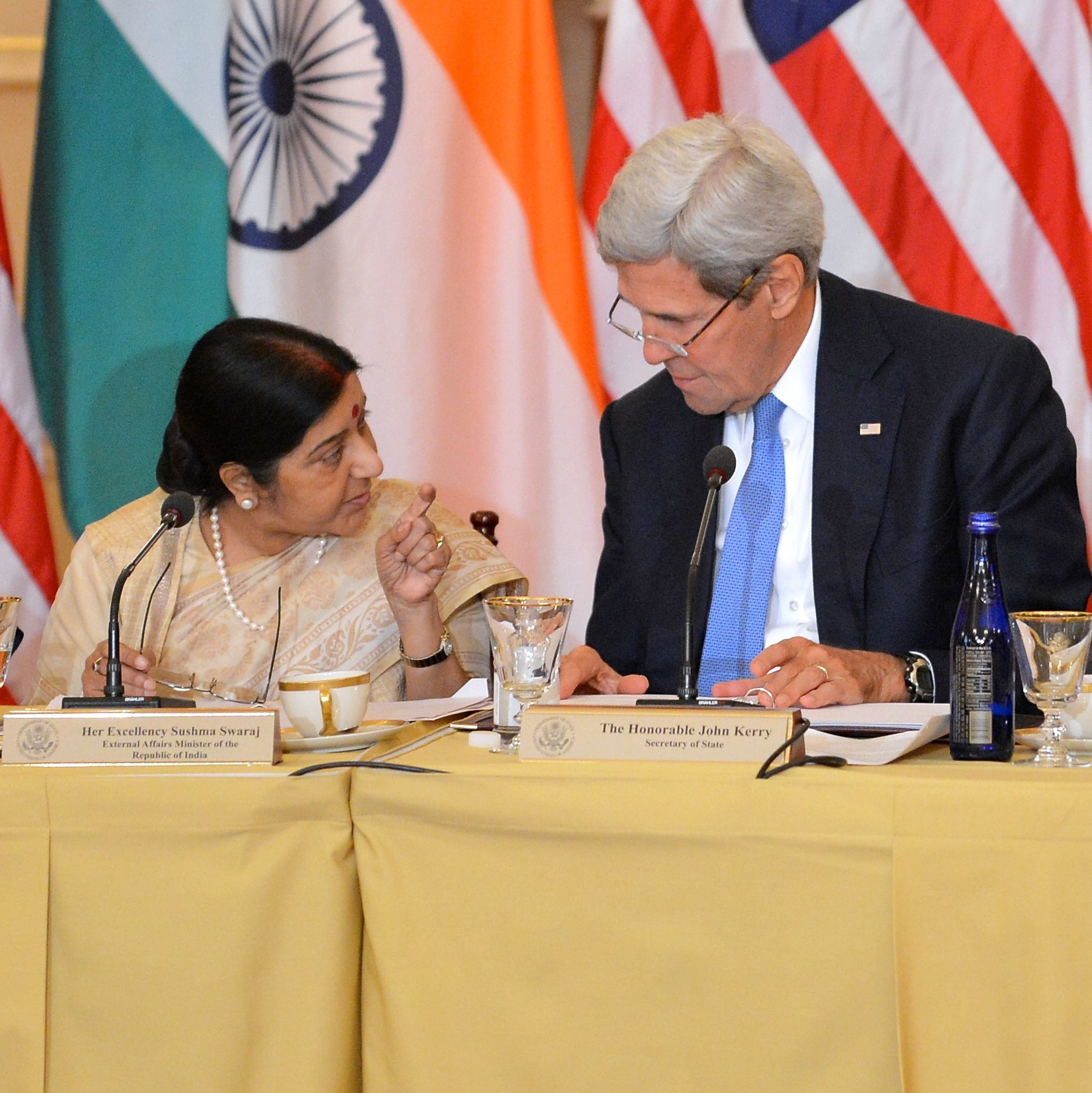
Indian External Affairs Minister Sushma Swaraj talks with U.S. Secretary of State John Kerry during the US-India Joint Strategic and Commercial Dialogue Opening Plenary, at the US Department of State in Washington DC, on 22 September 2015.

Sushma Swaraj was the Indian Minister of External Affairs under Prime Minister Narendra Modi from May 2014 till May 2019, responsible for implementing the foreign policy of Narendra Modi. She is only the second women to hold this position after Indira Gandhi.

== Background ==
Swaraj was a lawyer by profession and a seasoned parliamentarian with many 'first-timer' records in her name, often considered to be among the best spoken Indian politician and also known for her diplomatic skills. She served as the Leader of the Opposition in the 15th Lok Sabha from 2009 to 2014 and by virtue of her designation she had the opportunity to meet a galaxy of world leaders visiting India apart from her official foreign trips. This has significantly improved her understanding in world affairs and also helped her to develop a personal rapport with many important dignitaries.

== Policy initiatives ==
=== Fast-track Diplomacy ===
On completion of the first 100 days of Modi Government the External Affairs Ministry published a booklet called "Fast Track Diplomacy" show-casing the achievement made in the foreign policy arena. In her first media interaction, the minister Sushma Swaraj said the catchphrase for her tenure was "fast-track diplomacy" and said it had three faces – proactive, strong and sensitive. Since taking office, the External Affairs Minister held round-table meeting with all Indian heads of missions to the SAARC region, ASEAN region and Middle East separately as a follow up measure to carry forward the leads gained by high-profile visits and exchanges.

=== Act East Policy ===
From the very beginning, the NDA Government made it amply clear that India would focus more and more on improving relation with ASEAN and other East Asian countries as per India's Look East policy which was formulated during Narasimha Rao's Government in 1992 for better economic engagement with its eastern neighbours but successive Governments later successfully turned it into a tool for forging strategic partnership and security cooperation with countries in that region in general and Vietnam and Japan in particular. In her recent visit to Hanoi, Vietnam, Sushma Swaraj has stressed on the need for an Act East Policy that she said should replace India's over two decade-old Look East Policy emphasizing a more proactive role for India in this region.

== Multilateral engagements ==
=== ASEAN Regional Forum ===
Swaraj attended the 2014 ASEAN Regional Forum followed by the related EAS Foreign Ministers meeting, held from 8–11 August in Naypidaw, Myanmar, which was her first ever appearance in multilateral forums after becoming India's foreign affairs head. She had held bilateral meetings with her counterparts from seven countries including China, Australia, Canada, Vietnam, Philippines, Brunei and Indonesia.

== Foreign trips made as External Affairs Minister ==
The following is a list of international visits made by Swaraj after taking office as External Affairs Minister on 26 May 2014.

=== 2014 ===
Country	Areas visited	Date(s)	Purpose(s)	Notes
Bangladesh	Dhaka	26–27 June	Official visit	See also: Bangladesh–India relations Details Foreign Minister Sushma Swaraj visited Bangladesh on 26–27 June 2014, where she met her counterpart Abul Hassan Mahmood following a conversation with her counterpart's fellow Bengali and Chief Minister of West Bengal, Mamata Banerjee. Discussions were held regarding the Land Boundary Agreement, the proposed Teesta river pact and illegal immigration.
Bhutan	Thimphu	16–17 June	Official visit	See also: Bhutan–India relations Details She accompanied the Prime Minister in his maiden foreign tour to the Himalayan Kingdom of Bhutan with which India shares a special relation from decades.
Nepal	Kathmandu	27–29 July	Official visit	See also: India–Nepal relations Details Prior to Modi's visit, Swaraj made a three-day visit to Nepal from 27 July 2014 and co-chaired the Indo-Nepal Joint Commission meeting and also prepared the ground for Modi's scheduled visit. The last visit by a foreign minister of India to Nepal was made 23 years before.
Myanmar	Naypidaw	8–11 August	ASEAN Regional Forum	See also: India–Myanmar relations Details She visited Naypidaw for four days from 8 August for the 2014 ASEAN Regional Forum and EAS Foreign Ministers meeting. She had bilateral meetings with her counterparts from seven countries including China, Australia, Canada, Vietnam, Philippines, Brunei and Indonesia. External Affairs Ministry Spokesman Syed Akbaruddin said that they were working with Vietnam on a "high-level VVIP visit" from India later in the year, while Swaraj would travel there later in the month to pave the way for the visit. In regards to controversy of territorial ownership in the South China Sea, where ONGC Videsh has oil blocks, he said: "India is not a party to the dispute in the South China Sea. We feel that the dispute should be resolved between those who are party to it in a peaceful manner and it should be in accordance with international law." With Australia, discussion took place to expedite a civil nuclear deal. Swaraj invited Canadian Foreign Minister John Baird to India, which he "gladly accepted," in October.
Singapore	Singapore	16–18 August	Official visit	See also: India–Singapore relations Details External Affairs Minister Swaraj also visited Singapore on 16 August where she held talks with her counterpart, Shanmugam, and Prime Minister Lee Hsien Loong regarding Singapore's investment in India and their potential role in Modi's pet "smart city" project.
Vietnam	Hanoi	24–25 August	Official visit	See also: India–Vietnam relations Details Swaraj also made an official trip to Hanoi, Vietnam, where she called on Vietnamese President Truong Tan Sang and Vice-President Nguyan Tha Doan and held bilateral talk with her counterpart Pham Binh Minh. Her visit was also to lay the groundwork for the state visit by President Pranab Mukherjee from 14 to 17 September, days before the India visit of Chinese President Xi Jinping in India. Big ticket announcements are expected during President’s visit in defence and strategic cooperation including US$100 m line of credit for purchase of Fast attack craft for Vietnamese navy from India and enhancing oil exploration cooperation in offshore rigs on South China Sea provided by Vietnamese authority to ONGC Videsh.
Bahrain	Manama	7–8 September	Official visit	See also: Bahrain–India relations Details
Afghanistan	Kabul	10 September	Official visit	See also: Afghanistan–India relations Details Swaraj arrived in Kabul on 10 September to hold discussion with outgoing President Hamid Karzai amid hopes of final election results might be out in next couple of days and for the first time Afghanistan would experience a civilian transition of power since the fall of Taliban in 2001. Although the main agenda of her visit was to strengthen the Indo-Afghan strategic security cooperation following NATO withdrawal from the country by end of 2014 and re-emergence of the Taliban and other al-Qaeda in the subcontinent, the US-Afghan "bilateral security agreement" (BSA) was also expected to be featured in her discussion with Karzai. She also inaugurated a new Chancery complex in Kabul.
Tajikistan	Dushanbe	11–12 September	SCO	See also: India–Tajikistan relations Details On 11–12 September EAM Sushma Swaraj visited Dushanbe, Tajikistan to attend the 13th Annual summit of the Shanghai Cooperation Organisation, which is often regarded by the West as a counter organization of NATO, where India so far held an observer status but from Dushanbe summit, India was formerly granted a full membership so from next year on India will be represented by the President at the heads of state summit and if everything goes well, PM Modi could participate at the heads of government summit in Astana, Kazakhstan in December.
United States	New York City, Washington	24 September – 1 October	United Nations	See also: India–United States relations Details She is expected to hold meetings with her counterparts from around 100 countries and attend foreign ministers level meet of several special grouping such as IBSA, G4, BRICS, SAARC among others. She will then accompany Modi in his trip to Washington, D.C.
United Kingdom	London	17 October	Official visit	See also: India–United Kingdom relations Details She inaugurated the Regional Pravasi Bharatiya Divas in London.
Mauritius	Port Louis	1–3 November	Official visit	See also: India–Mauritius relations Details She was on a three-day visit to the Indian Ocean nation, to celebrate Apravasi Divas, marking 180 years since the first Indian indentured labourers arrived in Mauritius. There she had called on President Rajkeswur Purryag and Prime Minister Navinchandra Ramgoolam to discuss bilateral and regional issues of common interest, her agenda also includes talk on cooperation between Indian Navy and Mauritian Coast Guard to ensure the safety and security of the strategically vital Indian Ocean region. In support to her stress on the importance of maritime cooperation three major Indian war ships were docked in Mauritian waters including a destroyer INS Mumbai, a frigate INS Talwar and the fleet tanker INS Deepak.
Maldives	Malé	3 November	Official visit	See also: India–Maldives relations Details Foreign Minister Swaraj during her maiden trip to Malé on 3 November 2014 held discussion with her counterpart Dunya Maumoon on bilateral and regional issues of mutual interests and also reiterated India's strong commitment towards prosperity, stability and security of Maldives. The two sides also plans to celebrate 50 years of establishment of bilateral relation.
United Arab Emirates	Abu Dhabi	10–12 November	Official visit	See also: India–United Arab Emirates relations Details Foreign Minister Swaraj during her maiden trip to Abu Dhabi tried to win the confidence of potential UAE investors and welcomed them to join the new Indian Government efforts to build world class infrastructure in India which is expected to require foreign investments up to US$1 trillion in next five years. She had also held discussion with her counterpart Sheikh Abdullah bin Zayed Al Nahyan. During the meeting, both sides reviewed the existing bilateral relations and took stock of progress and development in joint cooperation in many areas and looked into the ways of enhancing them for common interests.
Nepal	Kathmandu	24–27 November	SAARC summit	See also: 18th SAARC summit and India–Nepal relations Details It was her second Nepal visit in little over four months. She participated in the SAARC Foreign Minister's meeting in Kathmandu on 25 November, a day before the summit begins. She also met Sartaj Aziz, foreign affairs adviser to Pakistan Prime Minister, on the margins which she later referred a "courtesy call".
South Korea	Seoul	28–30 December	Official visit	See also: India–South Korea relations Details Swaraj visited Republic to Korea to attend the 7th Joint-Commission meeting in Seoul. Trade and investments to top the agenda including joint shipbuilding ventures will be endorsed heavily under Make in India programme.

=== 2015 ===
Country	Areas visited	Date(s)	Purpose(s)	Notes
China	Beijing	31 January – 3 February	RIC summit and Official visit	See also: China–India relations Details Foreign Minister Sushma Swaraj made her maiden visit to the People's Republic of China from 31 January to 3 February where she met her counterpart Wang Yi and called on Chinese President Xi Jinping apart from participating in Russia–India–China (RIC) trilateral foreign ministers meeting in Beijing. She also met Russian foreign minister Sergei Lavrov separately on the sidelines. She inaugurated "visit India" campaign to promote more Chinese tourists in India.
Oman	Muscat	17–18 February	Official visit	See also: India–Oman relations Details Foreign Minister Sushma Swaraj made her maiden visit to the Sultanate of Oman, the country with which India shares warm bilateral relations in the Gulf.
Sri Lanka	Colombo	6–7 March	Official visit	See also: India–Sri Lanka relations Details Foreign Minister Swaraj arrived in Colombo, on her maiden visit to the island country, on 6 March 2015 to make the preparation for Prime Minister Modi's upcoming visit on 13 March. She called on Sri Lankan President Maithripala Sirisena and also call on Sri Lankan Prime Minister Ranil Wickremesinghe and held discussion on bilateral issues with her counterpart Mangala Samaraweera.
Turkmenistan	Ashgabat	7–9 April	Official visit	See also: India–Turkmenistan relations Details Foreign Minister Swaraj visited Ashgabat on 7 April 2015 on a three-day visit. There she met President Gurbanguly Berdymukhamedov besides co-chairing an inter-governmental joint commission with her counterpart Rashid Meredov. TAPI gas pipeline is believed to be the key agenda of talks between India and Turkmenistan.
Indonesia	Bandung	21–24 April	Bandung Conference	See also: India–Indonesia relations Details Foreign Minister Swaraj visited Bandung, Indonesia, to join the celebration of 60 years of Bandung Conference.
South Africa	Durban	18–21 May	Official visit	See also: India–South Africa relations Details Swaraj personally handed over the invitation for upcoming Third India Africa Forum Summit in New Delhi to South African President Jacob Zuma. She also participated in Ninth India-South Africa Ministerial meetings.
United States	New York City	20–22 June	Yoga Day celebration at United Nations	See also: India–United States relations Details
Nepal	Kathmandu	2 June	Donor's conference on Nepal earthquake Rehabilitation	See also: India–Nepal relations Details She held bilateral meeting with Chinese foreign minister Wang Yi apart from participating in Nepal quake donor's conference where India pledged US$1 billion for the rehabilitation work.
Thailand	Bangkok	27–29 June	Official visit	See also: India–Thailand relations Details
Egypt	Cairo	23–25 August	Official visit	See also: Egypt–India relations Details
Germany	Berlin	25–27 August	Official visit	See also: Germany–India relations Details
Pakistan	Islamabad	7–8 December	Heart of Asia conference	See also: India–Pakistan relations Details

=== 2016 ===
Country	Areas visited	Date(s)	Purpose(s)	Notes
Sri Lanka	Colombo	5–6 February		See also: India–Sri Lanka relations Details
Nepal	Pokhara	16–17 March	37th SAARC Council of Ministers' Meeting	See also: India–Nepal relations Details
Iran	Tehran	16–17 April		See also: India–Iran relations Details
Russia	Moscow	17–19 April		See also: India–Russia relations Details
Myanmar	Naypyidaw	22 August		See also: India-Myanmar relations Details
Italy	Rome	2–5 September		See also: India–Italy relations Details

== See also ==
- Foreign policy of the Narendra Modi government
- Condoleezza Rice as Secretary of State
- Hillary Clinton as Secretary of State
- Boris Johnson as Foreign Secretary
