= Herbert Fischer (diplomat) =

German politician and diplomat (1914–2006)

- Born: 10 April 1914; Herrnhut, Kingdom of Saxony, German Empire
- Died: 3 February 2006 (aged 91); Germany
- Occupations: Diplomat; Writer; Indologist
- Known for: Writings on Gandhiji
- Awards: Padma Bhushan; Patriotic Order of Merit

Herbert Fischer (1914–2006) was a German diplomat, indologist and the ambassador of the erstwhile German Democratic Republic to India from 1972 to 1976. Fischer was born on 10 April 1914 in Herrnhut, in East Germany to a craftsman. He migrated to western Europe in 1933, where he completed his studies. Fischer moved to India in 1936, which gave him the opportunity to get acquainted with Mahatma Gandhi. After Indian independence in 1947, he returned to the German Democratic Republic, where he joined the Ministry of Foreign Affairs in 1956. He served as the Chief of the East German Trade Mission in the late 1960s, before becoming the East German ambassador to India in 1972. He was the author of many Indological books, including Mohandas Karamchand Gandhi, a biography of the Indian leader. He was a recipient of the Patriotic Order of Merit III Class. In 2003, the Government of India awarded him the Padma Bhushan, their third highest civilian honour, for his contributions to public affairs.

== See also ==
- Mohandas Karamchand Gandhi
