= Germans in India =

Ethnic group

Total population
- 10,000-12,000

Regions with significant populations
- Chennai · Kolkata · New Delhi · Hyderabad · Bangalore · Visakhapatnam

Languages
- German · English

Religion
- Christianity · Sikhism · Hinduism · Judaism · Islam · Zoroastrianism · Buddhism · Baháʼí · Jainism · Irreligion · Atheism

Related ethnic groups
- German people

There is a small community of Germans in India consisting largely of expatriate professionals from Germany and their families as well as international students at Indian universities.

== History ==
=== Early immigration ===
The first Germans to arrive in India were missionaries. Bartholomäus Ziegenbalg, sent by Frederick IV of Denmark, came to eastern India for the propagation of the Gospel in the early 1700s. He along with Heinrich Plütschau became the first Protestant missionaries to India when they arrived at Tranquebar on July 9, 1706. In the late 1800s V. Nagel came to the Malabar Coast. He learned the Malayalam language and wrote several hymns. Hermann Gundert (1814–1893) also worked as a missionary scholar in Malayalam-speaking areas, where he translated the Bible into Malayalam. He also prepared a grammar of Malayalam and a bilingual dictionary and established two periodicals in Malayalam.

=== Modern era ===
In recent years, many German expatriates have either permanently moved or established long-term residence in India. Today, German expatriates have a strong presence in India, mainly in the mining and heavy engineering sector. In a 2007 news report, according to an executive of Locatech GmbH, an IT company, the availability of skill and the importance of intellectual property rights is well established in India at all levels – statutory, administrative and judicial. Therefore, doing business in India in comparison to China is considered a safe bet by some Germans in small and medium scale industries which intend to go global.

Chennai has a significant German community of around 8,000 people and they have integrated well with the local population. They mainly work in the banking, information technology, automobile, leather trading, education and food production industries. IIT Madras, a leading engineering and research institution located in Chennai, was established in 1959 with German assistance. Some higher educational institutions in the city have significant numbers of German students and teachers.

== Notable people ==
- Otto Königsberger - German architect and urban development planner, naturalised Indian
- Hermann Gundert - Missionary, scholar and linguist
- Gabriele Dietrich - Scholar and philosopher
- Suzanne Bernert - Actress in Bollywood films and television serials
- Ayesha Kapur - Actress
- Elnaaz Norouzi - Actress
- Chennamaneni Ramesh - Politician
- Bob Christo - Actor, originally from Australia, mother was German
- V. Nagel - German missionary in Malabar
- Sister Mary Prema - Superior General of the Missionaries of Charity of Calcutta
- Ferdinand Kittel - Priest and Indologist
- Bartholomäus Ziegenbalg - German missionary in Tranquebar
- Gustav Hermann Krumbiegel - German botanist and garden designer
- Friederike Irina Bruning - German animal rights activist

== See also ==
- Germany–India relations
- Indians in Germany
