= Hemin Hawrami =

Kurdish politician, writer, and academic

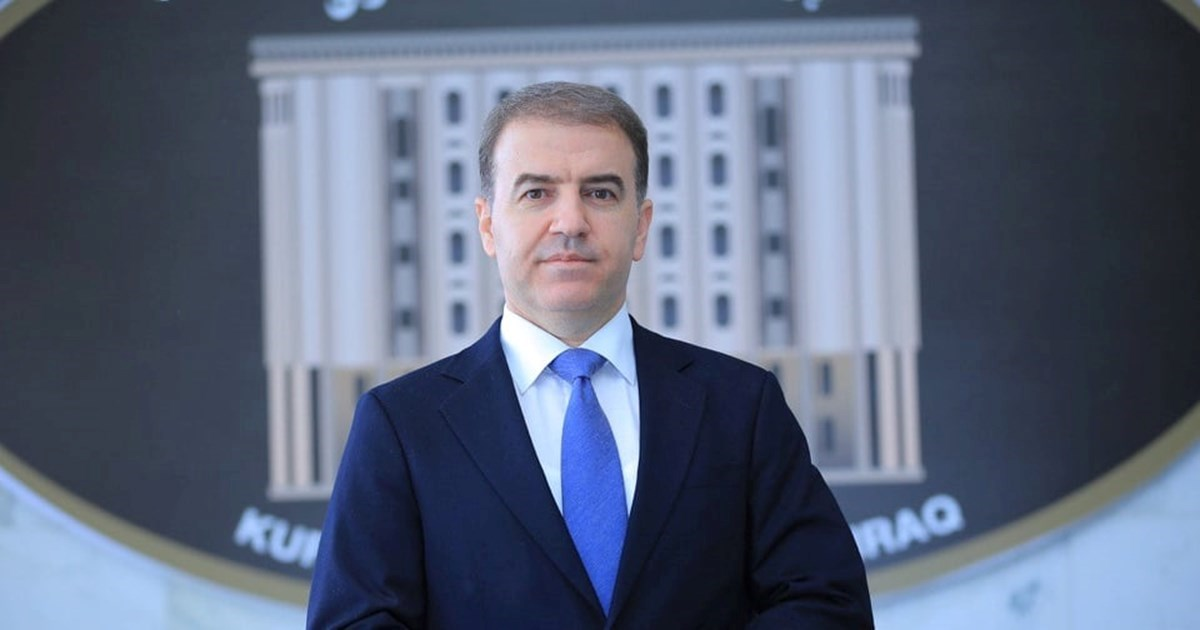
- Taken from Kurdistan Parliament website

Deputy Speaker of the Kurdistan Parliament
- In office 18 February 2019 – present
- Preceded by: Jaafar Eminki

Head of KDP Foreign Relations
- In office 2011–2017

Senior Advisor to President Masoud Barzani for Political and International Affairs
- In office 2017–2019

Personal details
- Born: Hemin Ahmed Hama Salah Hamad ھێمن ئەحمەد حەمەساڵح حەمەد; 23 March 1976 (age 50) Halabja, Kurdistan Region, Iraq
- Party: Kurdistan Democratic Party
- Children: 4
- Education: University of Salahaddin – BA in English Literature; University of Kurdistan Hewler – MA in International Relations; Soran University – PhD in International Relations
- Occupation: Politician, Writer, Academic

Hemin Hawrami (born March 23, 1976; Kurdish: ھێمن ھەورامی; full name: Hemin Ahmed Hama Salah Hamad) is a Kurdish politician, writer and academic. He has been the Deputy Speaker of the Iraqi Kurdistan Parliament since February 2019. He is a senior member of the Kurdistan Democratic Party. He was elected as a Member of the Kurdistan Parliament in September 2018. He was the head of the Kurdistan Democratic Party's foreign relations (2011–2017) and later a senior adviser to President Masoud Barzani (2017–2019) for political and international affairs. He holds a PhD in international relations and he has written eight books in Kurdish on Kurdish politics.

== Early life ==
Hawrami was born in the Kurdish city of Halabja in Slemani Governorate, Kurdistan, Iraq on 23 March 1976. In 1989 at the age of 13, Hawrami joined the Kurdistan Democratic Party (KDP)’s Students Union, which was active in areas where the Kurdish Peshmerga forces had control.

Hawrami graduated from high school in Halabja in 1994 and later read a bachelor's degree in English Literature at the University of Salahaddin in Erbil, graduating in 1999. In the KDP Students Union he was Editor in Chief of the union's Halabja newspaper. He left the Students Union in 2000.

The 1991 Kurdish uprising against Saddam Hussein took place when he was 15. Hawrami has said that during the uprising, without his father's knowledge he secretly entered Iraqi Kurdistan from an Iranian refugee camp and went to the city of Slemani on 23 and 24 March.

== Political career ==
After graduating from University of Salahaddin, Hawrami worked as a columnist and political opinion writer for the KDP's press, writing about national and regional politics in the KDP-owned Brayati newspaper and Gulan magazine. From 1999 to 2003 Hawrami translated numerous political writings between English and Kurdish for Brayati and Gulan.

Hawrami worked in President Masoud Barzani's office from 2004 to 2011, mainly using his English language skills and also sometimes Arabic and his fluency in Persian.

At the KDP's 13th congress in December 2010, Hawrami became the youngest member of the party's Leadership Council. He was elected with 742 votes of congress members to the 51-seat Leadership Council, coming 23rd in the election. There were 140 candidates in the election.

From July 2011 to February 2017, Hawrami was Head of the KDP's Foreign Relations Office. In 2014 and 2018 he travelled across Europe to campaign for the KDP among the Kurdish diaspora to vote abroad in the Iraqi parliament elections and the Kurdistan provincial council elections. From March 2017 to February 2019, Hawrami was Senior Advisor to President Masoud Barzani for political and international affairs.

Hawrami travelled abroad to speak at think tanks and universities. He spoke at the Middle East Institute in Washington D.C. in July 2015, at the Washington Institute for Near East Policy in February 2016, and at the University of Oxford's Middle East Centre in May 2017. He went to the Munich Security Conference as a Munich Young Leader in 2015, with President Masoud Barzani in 2017 as his political and international affairs adviser, and with Kurdistan Regional Government Prime Minister Masrour Barzani in 2020. In March 2020, he spoke at an open conference in the German Federal Parliament about the Kurdish Question in the Middle East, which was organized by German MP Helin Evrim Sommer.

=== Kurdistan independence referendum ===
Hawrami was in President Masoud Barzani's team that prepared and campaigned for the Kurdistan independence referendum of 25 September 2017. As Barzani's senior assistant, he was a vocal supporter of the referendum and of independence for Kurdistan from Iraq.

=== Election to Kurdistan Parliament ===
The KDP selected Hawrami to head the party's list of candidates in the 30 September 2018 Kurdistan parliamentary election. Hawrami campaigned on the message that "a strong KDP will strengthen Kurdistan" after five years of the war against ISIS and economic and humanitarian crises. He also campaigned for drafting a Kurdistan constitution and for economic and administrative reform and diversification.

In mid-August, some senior members of the Patriotic Union of Kurdistan political party hinted that they wanted to postpone the election. Hawrami responded forcefully several times on social media: “NO POSTPONMENT [sic]. It is vital for our democracy and a new start for a better work in serving Our citizens. No excuses." The KDP won the election with 688,070 votes, giving the KDP 45 seats, shy of a majority in the 111-seat parliament. Hawrami personally got 47,436 votes in the semi-open list system election. On 18 February 2019, MPs elected Hawrami as Deputy Speaker of the Kurdistan Parliament, with 68 votes. The election for the three parliament presidency posts was delayed for over three months because the KDP and Patriotic Union of Kurdistan (PUK) were still in protracted negotiations on forming a government coalition, which led to the PUK boycotting the vote for parliament's leadership positions.

== Education ==
Hawrami has a bachelor's degree in English Literature at the University of Salahaddin in Erbil, graduating in 1999. In 2016, he completed a master's degree in international relations at the English-language University of Kurdistan Hewler.

In 2017 he began writing a doctorate thesis in English on the European Union's foreign policy challenges in the Middle East, supervised by Soran University in Kurdistan Region, Iraq. He defended his doctoral thesis at a viva voce at Soran University on 10 December 2020, and was awarded his doctoral degree shortly after. Hawrami wrote on his Twitter account: "1st time in Kurdistan Region for a PhD thesis in International Relations to be written & discussed in English."

== Writings ==
Hawrami has written eight books in Kurdish on politics, including “Freedom and the Relationship between Opposition and Authority in a Democratic Experience”, “The Cadres Thought and the Political Marketing”, and “Impossible Politics in a Dynamic Equation.”

== Personal life ==
Hawrami is married and has three daughters and a son.
