= De-hyphenation =

Concept in international relations

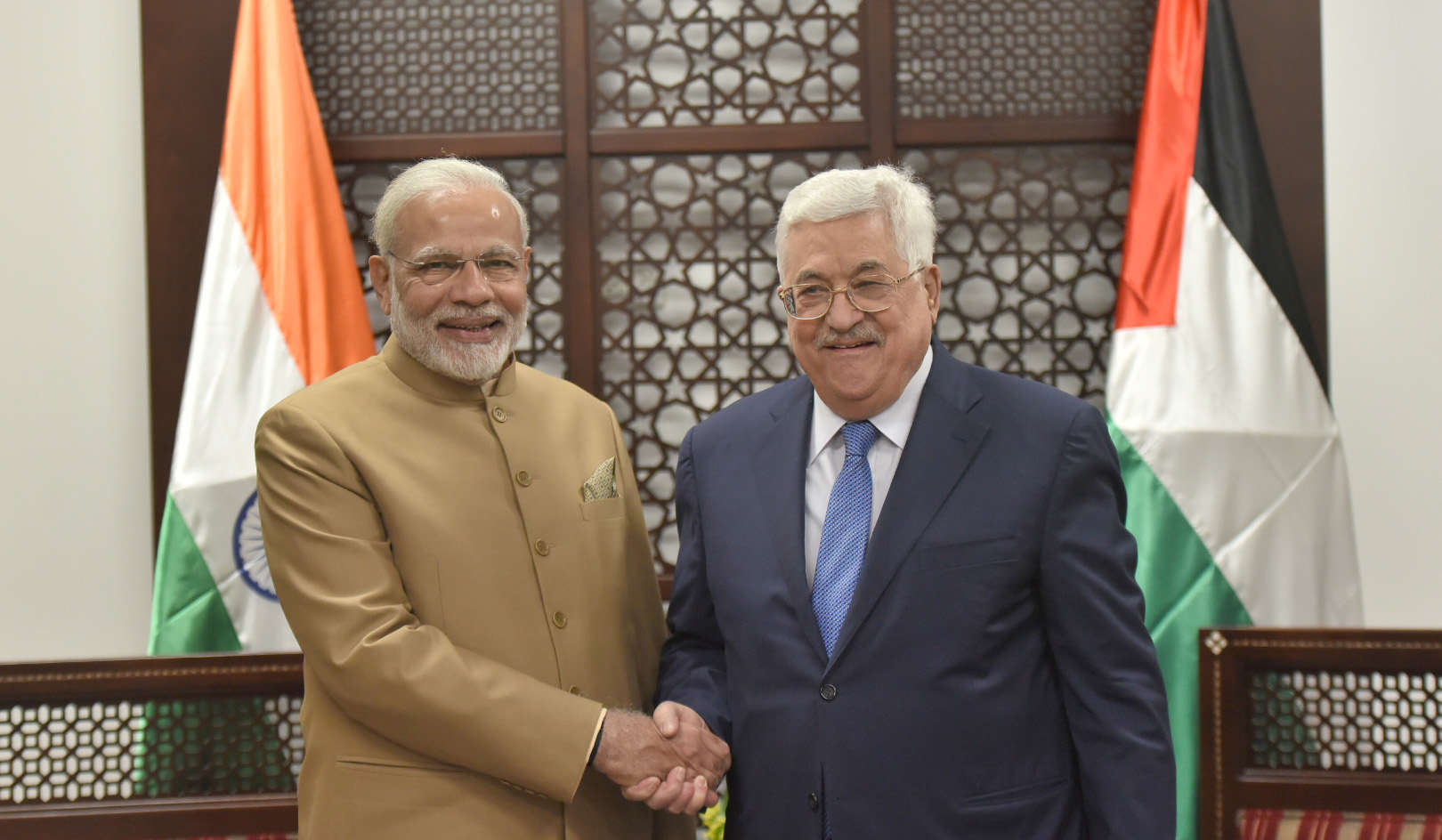
Indian Prime Minister Narendra Modi meeting Palestinian President Mahmoud Abbas in Ramallah. While India has friendly relations with Israel, it also has good diplomatic ties with Palestine.

De-hyphenation (also spelled dehyphenation) is a form of foreign policy where a country keeps diplomatic ties with two or more countries with conflicting interests, without letting the conflicts prioritize one country over another. The policy allows countries to hold independent relations with countries otherwise distrustful or hostile towards each other while treating each country as a single entity rather than as a part of a conflict with the other countries.

== Etymology ==
The term de-hyphenation refers to removing the "hyphen" that links two entities. In the context of foreign policy, it signifies the act of untangling or disentangling the relationships between two countries or regions that were previously considered together or linked in some way. By using the term "de-hyphenation," it emphasizes the need to treat each entity independently and distinctly, rather than as a combined or interconnected unit. The word effectively captures the concept of breaking apart the previously linked foreign policy approach to allow for more tailored and individualized strategies towards each entity.

== Examples of de-hyphenation ==
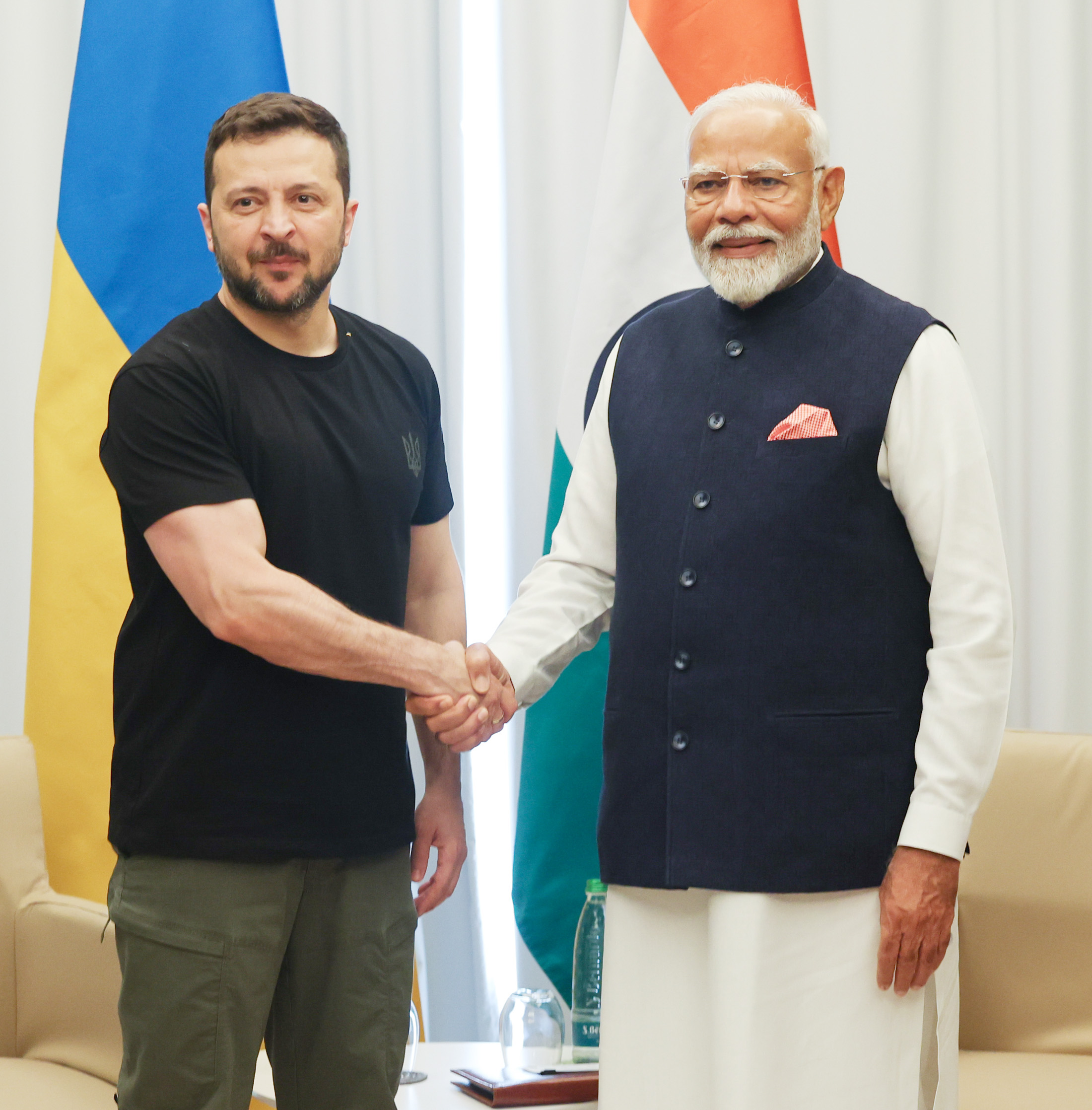
Modi meeting Ukrainian President Volodymyr Zelenskyy in June 2024 in Apulia, Italy. In spite of strong ties with Russia, India has been sending humanitarian aid to Ukraine due to the war.

=== Indian de-hyphenation policy on Israel and Palestine ===
In 2014, the then newly elected Prime Minister of India, Narendra Modi, instituted the de-hyphenation policy towards Israel. The aim behind the policy was to form diplomatic ties with Israel independent from the diplomatic ties India shall have with Palestine.

On 15 January 2018, the Prime Minister of Israel, Benjamin Netanyahu, visited New Delhi to sign agreements on cooperation in the areas of cyber-defence, security and science. The visit took place one month after India had voted in favor of a resolution brought by Turkey and Yemen in the United Nations to oppose a decision made by the United States to recognize Jerusalem as the capital of Israel, a decision that was strongly against Palestinian interests. Addressing the resolution, Netanyahu stated, "I don't think one vote affects the general trend and you can see it in many other votes that we have had here. Naturally, I'm disappointed but I think this visit is a testament to the fact that [India and Israel's] relationship is moving forward on so many fronts."

Later, in the beginning of February 2018, Modi became the first Prime Minister of India to visit Palestine. On visiting Ramallah stating, "[The] Friendship between India and Palestine has stood the test of time. The people of Palestine have shown remarkable courage in the face of several challenges. India will always support Palestine's development." In the same visit, the President of Palestine, Mahmoud Abbas, granted Modi the Grand Collar of the State of Palestine, the highest honor for a foreign dignitary in the nation.

=== Indian de-hyphenation policy on Russia and Ukraine ===
Since the beginning of the Russian invasion of Ukraine, India has maintained a diplomatically neutral stance on the issue, providing humanitarian aid to Ukraine at a time of the crisis, while also abstaining to vote in the United Nations General Assembly Resolution ES-11/1, a resolution condemning Russia over the invasion, demanding a complete withdrawal of the Russian troops from Ukraine and reversing the declaration of Luhansk and Donetsk republics.

On 20 March 2024, Modi spoke with the President of Ukraine, Volodymyr Zelenskyy, on strengthening the ties between India and Ukraine and to reiterate India's position on diplomacy and dialogue being the only means to end the war in Ukraine. The same day, Modi also contacted the President of Russia, Vladimir Putin, to congratulate him on his victory in the presidential elections that took place on 17 March.

On 28 March, the Foreign Minister of India, Subramaniam Jaishankar met his Ukrainian counterpart, Dmytro Kuleba in New Delhi to discuss India's role in helping to end the invasion. India has traditionally been an ally of Russia, which prompted Ukraine to approach India to mediate between the west and Russia. The meeting was also conducted to restore the level of cooperation between the two sides that existed before the invasion took place.

== See also ==
- Foreign policy of the Narendra Modi government
- Global Swing States
