= Dmitry Pankin =

Russian economist and politician (born 1957)

- Дмитрий Панкин
- Pankin in 2011.

3rd Chairman of the Federal Financial Markets Service
- In office 11 April 2011 – 1 September 2013
- Preceded by: Vladimir Milovidov
- Succeeded by: Body dissolved

Deputy Minister of Finance
- In office January 2008 – 11 April 2011
- In office 1 September 2013 – 1 February 2015

Chairman of the Eurasian Development Bank
- In office 18 February 2015 – 30 November 2017
- Succeeded by: Andrey Belyaninov

Chairman of the Black Sea Trade and Development Bank
- In office 16 July 2018 – 16 July 2022
- Preceded by: İhsan Uğur Delikanlı
- Succeeded by: Serhat Köksal

Personal details
- Born: 6 October 1957 (age 69) Leningrad, Russian SFSR, Soviet Union (now Saint Petersburg)
- Education: Leningrad State University (1981, 1987)

Dmitry Vladimirovich Pankin (Russian: Дмитрий Владимирович Панкин; born 6 October 1957) is a Russian economist, civil servant, and politician. Pankin previously served in governmental roles such as being the 3rd Chairman of the Federal Financial Markets Service (FFMS) from 2011 until it was dissolved in 2013 and was Deputy Minister of Finance from 2008 to 2011 and again from 2013 to 2015. Outside of the Russian government, he headed two international organisations: the Eurasian Development Bank, from 2015 to 2017, and the Black Sea Trade and Development Bank, from 2018 to 2022.

== Early life ==
Pankin was born on 6 October 1957 in the city of Leningrad, which was then part of the Russian SFSR of the Soviet Union. After graduating from secondary school, he entered the Leningrad State University, where he graduated in 1981 with a degree in political economy. Afterwards, he started teaching and became a lecturer at the Leningrad Agricultural Institute. Meanwhile, while teaching, he pursued higher studies and started doing postgraduate studies at the Leningrad State University. He graduated again in 1987 from the university with the title of Candidate of Economic Sciences, with his thesis being on the internal state debt of the mining and metallurgical enterprises.. Two years later, in 1989, he left the Leningrad Agricultural Institute when he was appointed as a senior lecturer at the Leningrad State Institute of Theatre, Music, and Cinema.

== Early banking and political career ==
After just a year as a senior lecturer, Pankin left again to become a civil servant, as he was appointed Head of the Department of the Committee for Economic Reform of the Executive Committee of the Leningrad City Council. After the collapse of the Soviet Union in 1991, he moved to become Head of the Department of the International Centre for Social and Economic Research, which was subordinated to the mayoral office of St. Petersburg (after Leningrad became Saint Petersburg). Pankin spent a year there before he was appointed Deputy Chairman of the Finance Committee of the Mayor's Office of St. Petersburg. Two years later, after the office was reorganised, he was appointed Deputy Chairman of the Committee on Economics and Finance of the Mayor's Office of St. Petersburg. However, he left later that year in December when he was appointed Head of the St. Petersburg Bank for Reconstruction and Development.

He stayed as chairman for another five years until 1999, when he was appointed to head the department of the electric power company RAO UES in Moscow. He returned to St. Petersburg after a year there, when he became Chairman of the St. Petersburg Bank for Reconstruction and Development for a second time. Pankin spent another three years there until 2003, when he left to enter governmental structures, becoming Deputy Director of the Department of International Financial Relations, Public Debt, and State Financial Assets of the Ministry of Finance of Russia in 2004. After just a year, he was promoted to director of the department.

== Deputy Minister of Finance ==
=== 2008-2011: First term ===
In early January 2008, Pankin was appointed one of the five Deputy Ministers of Finance under Prime Minister Viktor Zubkov. Pankin was specifically chosen to replace Sergei Storchak, who was arrested on charges of embezzlement earlier, and had his powers terminated on 20 December 2007. Pankin's specific policy areas as deputy minister were the management of the Stabilization Fund, international activities, and work on state policy and legality in the field of public debt. Shortly thereafter, the government nominated him to be on the supervisory board of Zarubezhneft. In 2009, as Deputy Minister of Finance, Pankin announced that the ministry intended to double domestic borrowings for 2010, and the following year also announced that the bill to create the Russian Financial Agency (ARF) was under consideration in the government, but that it would start no earlier than 2011. In the latter case, Pankin expressed doubts about transferring funds from the Russian National Wealth Fund (NWF) to ARF, saying that the size of the NWF was decreasing and did not have good prospects.

=== 2013-2015: Second term ===
In September 2013, he returned and was appointed Deputy Minister of Finance again. The role having been enlarged, he was one of ten in this role at the time. It was reported early on that he would oversee a major state project and manage the state debt of Russia. He left office soon after in February 2015.

== 2011-2013: Chairman of the FFMS ==
Pankin in 2011.

In March 2011, Pankin announced his candidacy for chairman of the federal executive body Federal Financial Markets Service (FFMS) after Vladimir Milovidov was dismissed as chairman. Pankin was confirmed later that month. Shortly after being elected, Pankin said that Russia faced a real threat of losing its securities markets, which he said were moving internationally. Pankin said this was due to the underdevelopment of institutions for domestic investors and Russian companies putting their shares on foreign exchanges, among other things. He called these developments "very unpleasant", with the Russian market lagging behind. However, his tenure was mainly marked by FFMS's "megaregulator" status. This came after the FFMS merged with the Federal Insurance Supervision Service (or Rosstrakhnadzor, FSSN) shortly before he was appointed chairman in April 2011. He also shifted the FFMS to be noticeably more liberal and flexible, with Pankin canceling the planned stricter requirements on professional securities market participants, which mainly affected brokers and dealers. Pankin also removed quantitative thresholds from licensing agreements, such as minimum numbers of clients and shareholders. Thus, his reception was mixed on various issues: Dmitry Alexandro said that Pankin had devoted less time to the collective investment market, while Konstantin Ugryumov said he was listening to market feedback.

However, his position in power did not last long. There were plans for the FFMS to merge into the Central Bank of Russia to create a bigger megaregulator, which came true in July, with Vladimir Putin abolishing the FFMS entirely and transferring its leftover assets to the Central Bank. He had earlier rejected talks of the merger in fall, saying the FFMS should have autonomy due to conflicts of interest and incompatibility. After it was abolished in September, Pankin confirmed he would be ready to work in a new capacity. However, his relations with the Central Bank of Russia, which, according to the "road map," he would likely join along with the staff of the FFMS, were damaged after Pankin continued to reject the merger of the FFMS, even after the decision was made, with some saying he was not ready for constructive dialogue. Relations also worsened because he insisted on a large increase for employees of the FFMS post-merger, which the Central Bank refused to do. However, some market participants continued to support Pankin after the merger, calling him a compromise figure. Indeed, a week later, in late August 2013, Pankin said he would not write an application to go with the Central Bank of Russia, but said he hoped that his deputies would still go to the Central Bank.

== 2015-2017: Eurasian Development Bank ==
In February 2015, Pankin was appointed Chairman of the Eurasian Development Bank (EDB). Shortly thereafter, he announced a meeting with Hovik Abrahamyan, the Prime Minister of Armenia, as part of the preliminary five-year plan of working in the country after Armenia joined the EDB in 2009. He also accused the previous management of failing to recognise provisions, with an audit soon after finding $200 million in provisions needing to be accrued. He also said there were "problems everywhere" in the EDB's previous projects. Pankin also confirmed the EDB would not step up to complete the abandoned European Bank for Reconstruction and Development (EBRD)'s projects in Russia, after the EBRD had withdrew from new projects in the country post-2014 due to the 2014 Russian annexation of Crimea, which resulted in numerous sanctions. However, he said that the EBD had signed a memorandum of cooperation with the EBRD for more work in the Eurasian sectre, with proposed joint projects being BAKAD, a ring road around Almaty, projeects with the KazTransGas Aimak company, and the Yereymentau wind farm.

He later said that the EBD was in talks with more countries, such as China, Vietnam, and Iran. He also advocated for projects on logistics terminals and the continuation of a highway that went from China to Orenburg, with the EBD continuing the Silk Road Economic Belt part to Belarus to transport Chinese goods through Russia to Europe. The bank also continued cooperating with the Asian Infrastructure Investment Bank (AAIB) and the New Development Bank, with the major joint proposal for AAIB being the proposed Belarus highway. Commenting on international sanctions on Russia, one of its member states, Pankin said that the bank noticed them and said they would abide by the sanctions requirements to not cooperate with companies on the sanctions list. In late 2017, he stepped down as Chairman of the EBD, with the Ministry of Finance of Russia in turn nominating the Head of the Federal Customs Service of Russia, Andrey Belyaninov, to head it afterwards. Belyaninov did indeed succeed him.

== 2018-2022: Black Sea Trade and Development Bank ==
In July 2018, Pankin became Chairman of the Black Sea Trade and Development Bank (BSTDB), with a term of four years. Under his initial tenure, the BSTDB began heavily increasing its portfolio and projects in Russia. Among the increase in activities in Russia, Pankin signed memoranda of cooperation with Vladimir Oblast. However, he said that Ukraine, which was still a member of BSTDB, got along with Russia in the BSTDB despite this, and that there were good projects there, but that it had instability. The bank also began cooperating more with Armenia and said that the bank was interested in lending to banks for the private sector and an airport lending project. However, Greece, one of its members, also began refocusing from the BSTDB, and planned to create its own development bank due to its previous debt crisis. Towards the end of the tenure, the Russian invasion of Ukraine heavily affected the BSTDB, as Panakin said the bank was put in a difficult position as both were member states. After his four-year term ended in July 2022, he was replaced in office.

== Personal life ==
As of 2010, he earned an annual income of 6.39 million rubles, which was far more than previous deputy ministers, and he owned two apartments. In 2016, it was reported that Pankin's father, Vladimir, and his daughter, Elena, owned a 50/50 stake in "A-Proekt" via the firm "Stroyinvest-SPb". A-Proekt is a St. Petersburg-based company that was engaged in roadwork, for which it was given millions of rubles, and was valued at 2.5 billion rubles. In response to the report, Alexey Gudym of "A-Proekt" said Dmitry had never participated in the company. It was also reported that Pankin's relatives owned three real estate companies in Bulgaria (Niya, BG Fortis, and Rikedom) alongside the London-registered Sky Terrace Limited. It was later reported in 2019 that his daughter, Elena, had worked at Deutsche Welle at its Moscow branch from 2009 to 2011, and then at its London branch from 2011. It was speculated that, that year, she was one of the Deutsche Welle employees who were fined as part of proceedings in the U.S. over the bank's hiring of relatives of local officials in Russia and Asia.

== Honours and awards ==
Pankin has been awarded the following:

- Medal of the Order "For Merit to the Fatherland", II degree (2007)
- Order of Friendship (2011)
- Medal "For Contribution to the Development of the Eurasian Economic Union" (2019)
