= Paulo Nogueira Batista Jr. =

Brazilian economist

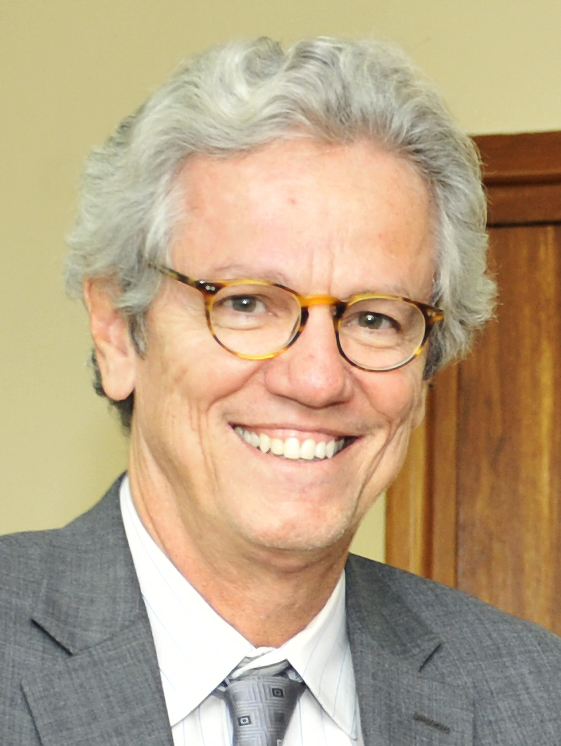
- Batista in 2015

Former Vice President for the New Development Bank

Former International Monetary Fund Executive Director

Personal details
- Born: April 2, 1955 (age 71) Rio de Janeiro, Brazil
- Education: Pontifical Catholic University,Rio de Janeiro; London School of Economics
- Occupation: Economist

Paulo Nogueira Batista Jr (born April 2, 1955) is a Brazilian economist who was an Executive Director at the International Monetary Fund (IMF) from April 2007 to June 2015. He also was one of the founding members of the New Development Bank (NDB) in Shanghai, where he held the vice-presidency between 2015 and 2017. Author of seven books (two of them in English) and a vast list of economic papers and publications, Nogueira has been also a frequent contributor to Brazilian magazines and websites as Carta Capital and Brasil 247. The relation between nation, nationalism and globalization is one of his favorite subjects.

== Focus on international issues ==
Since the early 1980s, Nogueira has focused on international economic issues, mostly on financial matters and debt renegotiations. First, as an economic researcher in the Getulio Vargas Foundation in Rio de Janeiro. Subsequently, working for the Brazilian government, where he served as Under Secretary for Economic Affairs, Ministry of Planning (1985-1986) and as Advisor to the Minister of Finance on External Debt (1986-1987). He was also the head of the Center for Monetary and International Economic Studies at Getulio Vargas Foundation in Rio de Janeiro (1986-1989) and a professor of economics at Getulio Vargas in São Paulo (1990-2007). During and after his years at the IMF, Nogueira was known for defending the claims of emerging countries. In 2012, for example, Nogueira said that the IMF staff mostly played down the responsibility of advanced nations for the destabilizing surges in international capital flows with major effects on emerging markets.

== Executive Director at the IMF ==
Nogueira was nominated Executive Director at the IMF in 2007 by Brazil's Finance Minister Guido Mantega during the administration of President Luiz Inácio Lula da Silva. He was elected to represent Brazil and its eight other partners in the Executive Board (Colombia, Dominican Republic, Ecuador, Guyana, Haiti, Panama, Suriname and Trinidad & Tobago). These countries formed the Brazilian constituency at the IMF, whose interests were represented by Nogueira. During his tenure, the number of countries in the Brazilian constituency rose from 9 to 11, with the departure of Colombia and the entry of Cabo Verde, Nicaragua and Timor-Leste.

At first, his nomination strengthened financial market perceptions that Brazilian President Lula da Silva would loosen the orthodox policy of his first term (2003-2006) since Nogueira was known for being a strong critic of the Central Bank of Brazil and even of the IMF itself. In fact, Mantega chose Nogueira because they both advocated a package of reforms that would change the IMF quotas and reorganize its governing structure in favor of emerging countries.

Indeed, during the eight years Nogueira worked in the IMF this reform occupied a central position in his work. He took a strong stance on the need to make the institution more representative of the 21st century and together with other executive directors of developing countries managed to produce a shift in quotas and votes in the 2008 and 2010 governance reforms. While not enough to produce a major overhaul in the balance of power within the IMF, these changes shifted some voting power to emerging countries, notably to China and Brazil itself. The Brazilian economist also took part in the internal debate and decisions that produced in 2009 the IMF reform of credit instruments and the tripling of the institution's resources, which reached the amount of US$750 billion. Throughout this whole process, Nogueira wrote many articles about this issue. In a op-ed published in 2022 by The Financial Times, he argued that emerging markets need a bigger voice in the Fund. Nogueira explored this idea as well as a featured speaker invited by institutions like Boston University and the Brookings think tank

In some situations, Nogueira did not refrain from giving his position on sensitive issues, such as the IMF aid for Greece in 2013. In an unusual public statement, Brazil’s Executive Director said that the Greece's implementation of austerity measures had been “unsatisfactory in almost all areas” and assumptions about growth and debt sustainability “continue to be over-optimistic.”

In an earlier statement on Greece to the IMF’s Executive Board, at the inception of the Greek crisis, in May 2010, Nogueira highlighted the view that the proposed program “may be seen not as a rescue of Greece, which will have to undergo a wrenching adjustment, but as a bailout of Greece’s private debt holders, mainly European financial institutions.”

In a recent paper published by The Bretton Woods Project, Nogueira dealt with this topic again, this time proposing a gradualist approach to IMF reform. This would involve specific reforms that could expand the relevance of the Fund to emerging market and developing countries, especially those that are low-income, small and climate vulnerable. He suggested, for instance, a higher proportion of basic votes to enhance the voting power of smaller nations and an increase in the overall resources available to the Fund. The central ideas that inspire this paper were also posted on the London School of Economics website.

== Vice-president of the NDB (The BRICS bank) ==
Nogueira joined the IMF in Washington, DC, in 2007. A year later, the BRICS cooperation began through an initiative by Russia. Over the course of a few years, the group's coordination was mature enough to launch a development bank and an emergency reserve fund. "If the existing institutions were doing their jobs perfectly, there would be no need to go to the trouble of creating a new bank, a new fund," said Nogueira during the 6th BRICS Summit in Fortaleza, Brazil, on July 15, 2014.

He was involved in the negotiations that led to the founding of the New Development Bank (NDB), and the BRICS Contingent Reserve Arrangement. As the first President of the NDB, K. V. Kamath, was Indian, the other four countries could each designate a vice-president. Nogueira was then indicated by the Brazilian government to take office as one of the vice-presidents of the NDB. Following the second meeting of its Board of Directors in November 2015, the institution announced the allocation of formal responsibilities to the four vice-presidents of the Bank and the Brazilian economist took office as Chief Risk Officer, in charge also of strategy, expansion of membership and economic research, a position he held until October 2017.

== The USA as the "greatest enemy" of its own dollar ==
Nogueira argued that discussions on the reform of the monetary system and the dedollarisation of international transactions have been created by the US itself. He emphasized that the USA undermined the global dominance of the dollar by making excessive use of financial sanctions, punitive measures, freezing accounts, and excluding countries from the SWIFT system, and has turned the international financial architecture into a geopolitical weapon. This destroyed global trust, as other nations — not just Russia, Iran, India, Venezuela, or China, but the entire Global South — realized that their dollar reserves were not secure in a crisis. It was in this context that discussions began among the BRICS countries on the convenience of moving towards a monetary association and eventually a common reference currency for international transactions.

From this perspective, Nogueira has participated in many seminars around the world about this issue. In August 2023, for instance, the organizers of BRICS Seminar on Governance & Cultural Exchange Forum in Johannesburg invited him to present his views on issues faced by the BRICS grouping. He said then that the increasing multipolarization of the world in economic and political terms seems inconsistent with the indefinite continuation of a basically unipolar world monetary system.

For an emerging economy like Brazil, dollar hegemony entailed a permanent dependence on the monetary policy decisions of the US Federal Reserve. In his book O Brasil não cabe no quintal de ninguém ("Brazil does not fit in anyone’s backyard"), he argued for economic sovereignty. To break free from this grip, he proposed concrete steps: Trade in local currencies: Utilizing mechanisms such as the currency swap agreement between Brazil and China to bypass the dollar in bilateral trade. An alternative financial architecture: Drawing on his experience as a former IMF director and vice president of the BRICS New Development Bank, he advocated for the creation of a payment system independent of the US, as well as the long-term introduction of a common BRICS reference currency.

Batista takes a nuanced view of China and argued that a multipolar world order cannot mean replacing dollar hegemony with yuan hegemony. For one thing, due to strict capital controls, Beijing has no interest in transforming the RMB into a fully unregulated global reserve currency. Furthermore, the fundamental contradiction would persist if the global system were once again to depend on the national currency of a single state. The goal, therefore, must be a genuine multi-currency system.

In 2025, Batista criticized Brazilian policy for calling for dedollarisation at a rhetorical level — for instance, through President Lula — while remaining too hesitant in its practical, state-level actions within the BRICS framework.

== Books in English ==
Nogueira wrote two books in English:

International Financial Flows to Brazil Since the Late 1960s: Analysis of Debt Expansion and Payments Problems (1987, World Bank) ISBN 978-0821308912 - This work was originally written as a background paper for the preparation of the World Development Report 1985. The author provides a sequential analysis of the development of debt-creating financial flows to Brazil since the late 1960s and offers a discussion of the rescheduling agreements between Brazil and its creditors.

The BRICS and the Financing Mechanisms They Created: Progress and Shortcomings (2021, Anthem Press) ISBN 978-1-83998-206-4 - The author assesses the progress and shortcomings of the BRICS financing mechanisms to date and also presents an analysis of aspects of the international economy related to the BRICS, in particular of their relations with the West. The book includes a discussion of the future of the BRICS, highlighting that joint action by the five countries is likely to remain an important feature of the international landscape in the decades to come. Even though the group become more lopsided due to the increase of China's relative political and economic importance, Nogueira expects that China will retain a lasting interest in BRICS cooperation - even more so if its relations with the United States remain fraught with tensions.

== The social challenge in a post-pandemic world ==
In Nogueira's view, the COVID-19 pandemic has shown the importance of coordination among nations. It has also highlighted the role of the BRICS in dealing with the tasks of fighting the pandemic and fostering the development of their economies and of other developing countries. Indeed, the NDB Board approved large and defined program loans for the member countries, including China.

"For many developing countries, their needs are not adequately recognized by the international organizations", Nogueira said at the BRICS Seminar on Governance in 2021, promoted by China. In his evaluation, the BRICS countries can help boost the common development and prosperity of all countries. Nogueira cited, in particular, the progress made by China and India in improving the livelihoods of their citizens and tackling poverty.

== Give peace a chance in Ukraine ==
Aware that there are no prospects for a short-term solution in the Russian invasion of Ukraine, the economist believes that peace is still possible. Results will probably not come immediately, but, in his view, the ground needs be prepared by creating a group of neutral countries that can bridge the gap between the parties in conflict, as proposed by Brazilian President Luiz Inácio Lula da Silva. In an article written for Global Policy, Nogueira sketches some elements of what could be a possible diplomatic solution which might satisfy all or almost all those involved.
