= Black Sea Trade and Development Bank =

Organization

- Formation: January 24, 1997
- Type: International Financial Institution
- Headquarters: Thessaloniki, Greece
- Location: Europe
- Region served: Countries around the Black Sea
- Members: 11: Albania; Armenia; Azerbaijan; Bulgaria; (Georgia (country)) Georgia; Greece; Moldova; Romania; Russia; Turkey; Ukraine
- President, Chairman of the Board of Directors: Serhat Köksal (16 July 2022 - present)
- Revenue: ▲EUR 63.7 million (2022)
- Website: www.bstdb.org

The Black Sea Trade and Development Bank (BSTDB) is an international development finance institution serving the eleven member founding countries of the Black Sea Economic Cooperation, a regional economic organization. It supports economic development and regional cooperation by providing loans, guarantees, and equity for development projects and trade transactions. BSTDB supports both public and private enterprises in member countries and does not attach political conditionality to its financing.

Objectives of the bank include promoting regional trade links, cross country projects, foreign direct investment, supporting activities that contribute to sustainable development, with an emphasis on the generation of employment in the member countries, ensuring that each operation is economically and financially sound. The bank has an authorized capital of EUR 3.45 billion.

BSTDB is governed by the Agreement Establishing the Black Sea Trade and Development Bank, a United Nations registered treaty. The Agreement came into force on January 24, 1997. BSTDB commenced its operational activities in June 1999.

== Ratings ==
In April 2022, Moody's Investors Service rated BSTDB "A2" long term with stable outlook. Standard & Poor's rating agency assigned BSTDB a long term issuer rating of "A−" with stable outlook. Scope Ratings evaluates BSTDB at A− with negative outlook.

== Management ==
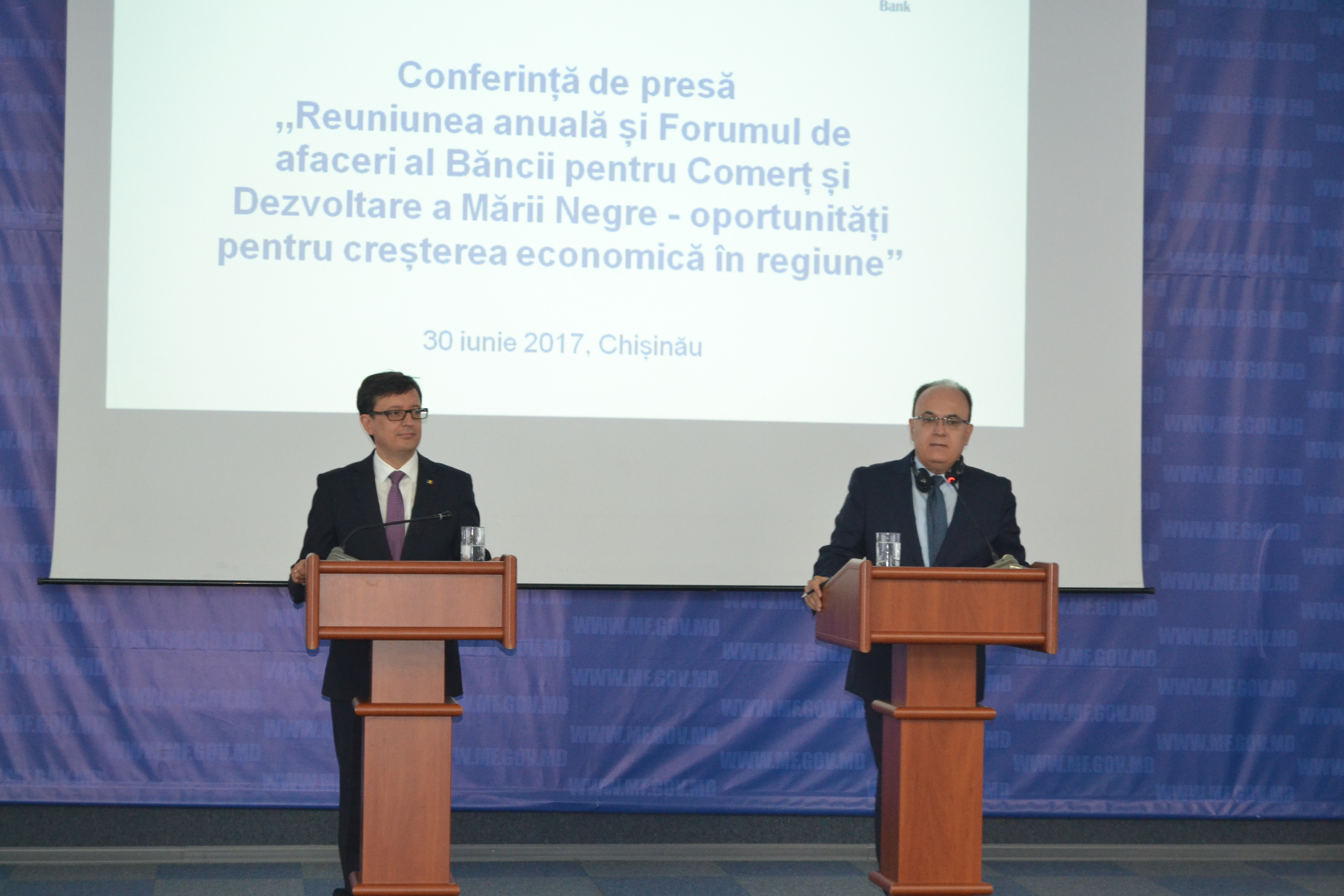
İhsan Uğur Delikanlı (right), then-president of BSTDB, during a joint press conference with Moldovan finance minister Octavian Armașu in Chișinău, 30 June 2017

The Bank is overseen by the Board of Governors, Board of Directors, the President, three Vice Presidents and the Secretary General. The head of the Board of Directors and the chief executive of the Bank is the Director. Board of Directors appoints the Vice Presidents and the Secretary General.

In 2018, Dmitry Pankin was appointed the President for the term of four years. Pankin was succeeded by Serhat Köksal in July 2022.

Each shareholder appoints one person to the Board of Governors and one to the Board of Directors.

== Member states ==
member states

Although the Black Sea Economic Cooperation organization has thirteen members, membership in the bank only includes the eleven founding members:

Bank members and their shareholdings:

Country	Shareholding	Paid up capital	Note
Albania	2.0%	€13.8m	
Armenia	1.0%	€6.9m	
Azerbaijan	5.0%	€34.5m	
Bulgaria	13.5%	€93.15m	
Georgia	0.5%	€3.45m	
Greece	16.5%	€113.85m	
Moldova	0.5%	€3.45m	(reduced from 1% in 2011)
Romania	14.0%	€96.6m	
Russia	16.5%	€113.85m	
Turkey	16.5%	€113.85m	
Ukraine	13.5%	€93.15m	
unallocated	0.5%		

Each shareholder has an obligation to pay additional capital if called upon, in total an additional €1.602 billion.

Serbia and North Macedonia are full members of the Black Sea Economic Cooperation organization, however they do not have any shareholding percentages in the bank.

== Observer organizations ==
Observer organizations of the Black Sea Trade and Development Bank, include:

- Asian Development Bank (ADB)
- Association of European Development Finance Institutions (EDFI)
- European Bank for Reconstruction and Development (EBRD)
- European Investment Bank (EIB)
- International Finance Corporation (IFC)
- Islamic Corporation for the Development of the Private Sector, of the Islamic Development Bank (ICD)
- KfW
- Nordic Investment Bank (NIB)
- Development Bank of Austria (OeEB)
- Proparco

=== Partnership agreements ===
- The BSTDB finalized a strategic partnership agreement with the Eurasian Development Bank in February 2018.
- In July 2018, the BSTDB signed a cooperation agreement with the OPEC Fund for International Development.
- In October 2008, the BSTDB finalized a cooperation agreement with the Development Bank of Austria

== See also ==
- Black Sea Forum for Partnership and Dialogue
- Black Sea trade and economy
- Organization of the Black Sea Economic Cooperation (BSEC)
- International Center for Black Sea Studies (ICBSS)
- International financial institutions
