= ECO Trade and Development Bank =

Multilateral development bank

- Industry: Finance
- Founded: 2005
- Headquarters: Şişli, Istanbul, Turkey
- Area served: ETDB member countries
- Key people: Mohammad Hashem Botshekan (CEO)
- Website: www.etdb.org

The ECO Trade and Development Bank (ETDB) is a regional multilateral development bank established under the auspices of the ECO Economic Cooperation Organization to promote socio-economic development and intra-regional trade amongst ECO member states. Its current President is Mohammad Hashem Botshekan from Iran.

The ETDB was established in 2005 with its headquarters located in Istanbul. The bank started its operations in 2008. The representative offices of the bank in Tehran and Karachi are functional.

The primary objective of the bank is to provide financial resources for investment projects and development programmes in member countries.
