= Arab Bank for Economic Development in Africa =

Bank for the development of Arabic countries

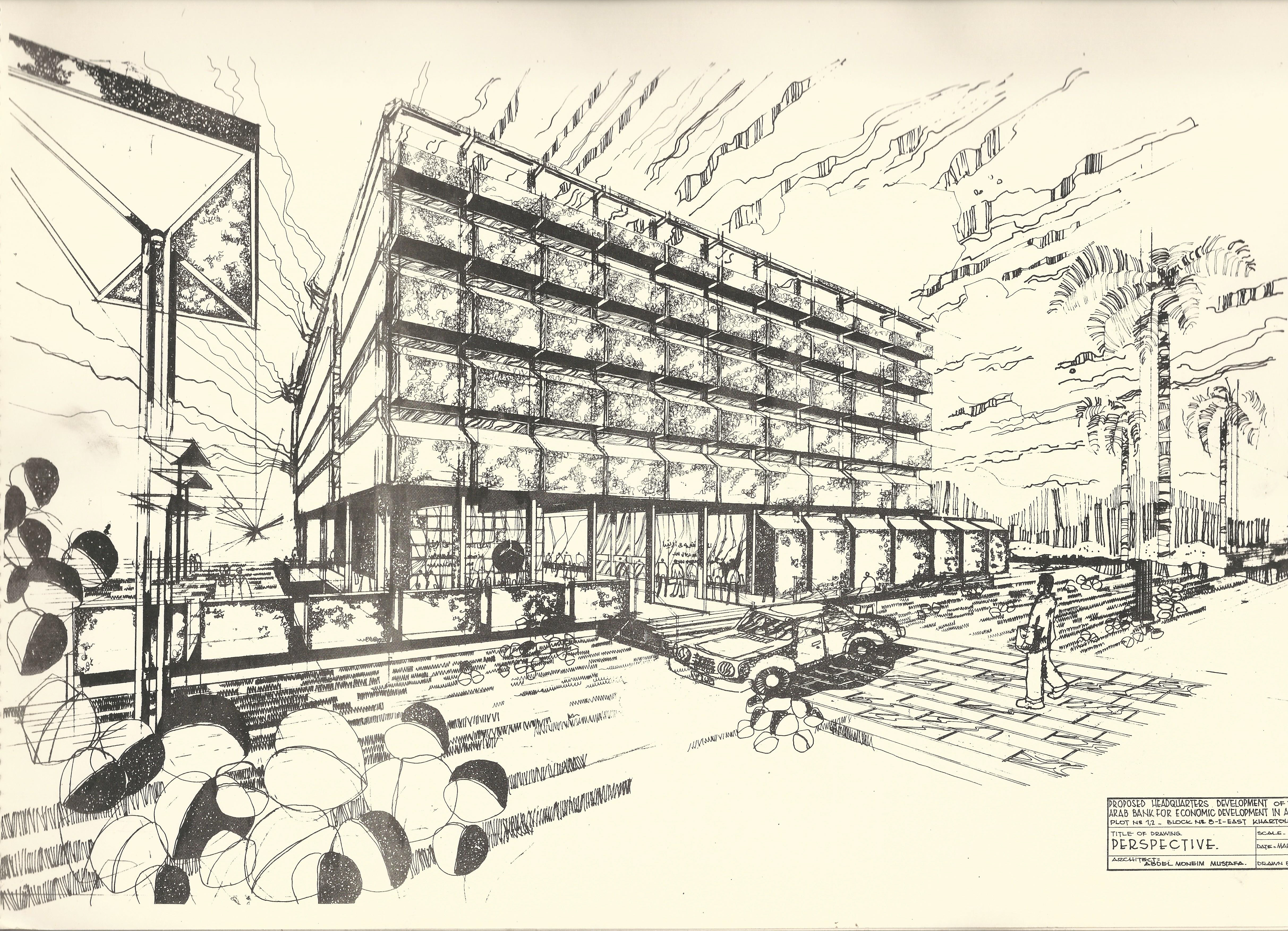
- BADEA Headquarters, Khartoum - perspective design by Abdel Moneim Mustafa in 1977
- Abbreviation: BADEA
- Formation: November 28, 1973; 52 years ago (Treaty signed); March 1975 (Treaty in force)
- Type: International Financial Institution
- Legal status: Treaty
- Headquarters: Khartoum, Sudan
- Members: Arab League
- Official language: English; Arabic; French
- President: Abdullah Almusaibeeh
- Website: www.badea.org

The Arab Bank for Economic Development in Africa (BADEA) (French: Banque Arabe pour le Développement Economique en Afrique) (Arab:المصرف العربي للتنمية الاقتصادية في أفريقيا) is a development bank owned by the Arab League to provide development financing to African countries.

It was established pursuant to the resolution of the 6th Arab Summit Conference at Algiers on the 28 November 1973. The Bank was created for the purpose of strengthening economic, financial and technical cooperation between the Arab and African regions and for the embodiment of Arab-African solidarity.

The Bank is an international financial institution enjoying full international legal status and complete autonomy in administrative and financial matters. It is governed by the provisions of its establishing agreement and the principles of international law.

== History ==
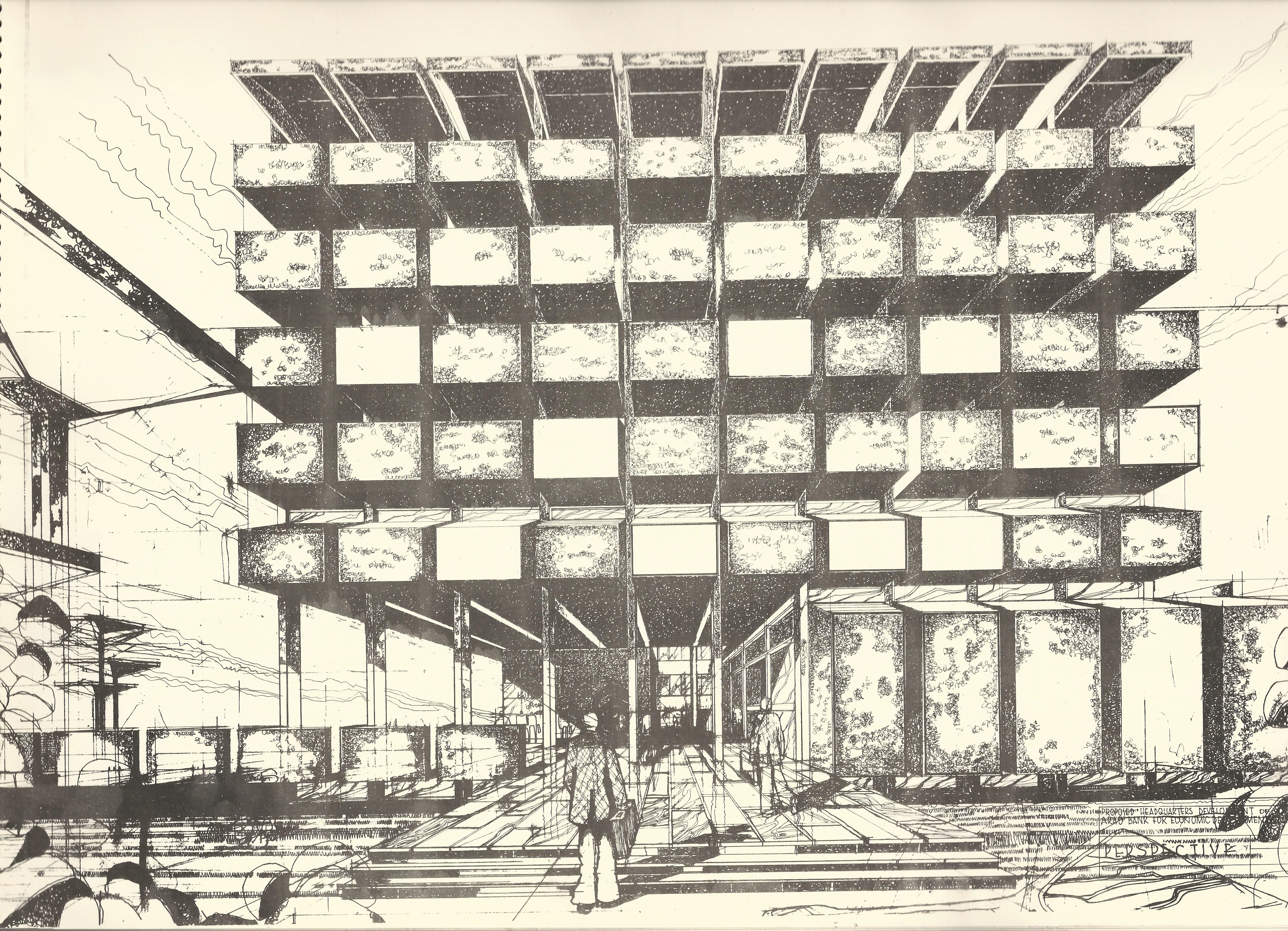
Arab Bank for Economic Development, Khartoum, 1977 designed by Abdel-Moneim Mustafa

The Bank began operations in March 1975. BADEA is a financial institution owned by eighteen Arab countries members of the League of Arab States (LAS) which signed its Establishing Agreement on 18 February 1974.

=== The Seventh Five-Year Plan (2015 – 2019) ===
The Board of Governors has approved in its 39th session, convened in Tunis, Tunisia from 8 to 9 April 2014, the 7th five-Year Plan (2015 – 2019), which will come into force by January 2015. Since 1983 BADEA has pursued its activities through five-year plans relating the available resources to the needs of African recipient countries. It adopted a strategy based on gradual increase in the financial resources earmarked for financing in accordance with expansion of its operations to meet the rising needs of Sub-Saharan African countries, in all spheres especially in terms of food, transport, health, education and human resources development. The allocations for the Seventh Five-Year Plan (2015 -2019), etc.stood at US$1.600 million, representing an increase of US$600 million compared to the Sixth Five-Year Plan (2010 – 2014). The first year of the plan, commitments start at US$250 million and increase annually to reach US$350 million in 2019. Within this plan, US$1100 million will be earmarked for the public sector projects, US$450 million for the private sector projects and US$50 million for the technical assistance operations. Moreover, between US$150 and 250 million will be assigned annually throughout the five years of the plan for financing trade between Arab and African countries.

== Structure and Objectives ==
Headquarters The Bank's Headquarters are located in Khartoum, the capital of the Republic of the Sudan.

=== Objectives ===
The Bank was created for the purpose of strengthening economic, financial and technical cooperation between the Arab and African regions and for the embodiment of Arab-African solidarity on foundations of equality and friendship. To achieve this end, the Bank was given a mandate to:

- Participate in financing economic development in African countries.
- Stimulate the contribution of Arab capital to African development.
- Help provide the technical assistance required for the development of Africa.

=== Lending Operations ===
BADEA interventions included various products that have been enhanced and diversified to meet the economic needs of beneficiary countries. They have been steadily promoted to fit the development mechanisms and their conducive atmosphere. These products could be categorized as follows : 1. Financing development projects: It is the most important product in term of volume. Loans to finance projects are extended in concessionary terms, that some projects are financed with a grant element exceeding 50%. 2. Financing technical assistance operations: They are extended as grants to finance feasibility studies for development projects and institutional support operations. 3. Financing Arab exports to African countries: A program launched in 1983. 4. Promote Arab investments in African countries: BADEA has adopted several methods in this regard. 5. Debt relief on Heavily Indebted Poor Countries (HIPC) : 28 countries have benefited from this initiative. 6. Financing Urgent Aid : A limited activity which was extended to Sahelian countries that faced drought in 1987.

==== Poverty Reduction ====
The most fundamental goal of BADEA in its intervention in all sectors is poverty alleviation. To that end, priority is given to development projects with direct and indirect impact on poverty reduction. Since poverty touches rural population and those living in urban zones, at the margin of cities "urban poor", BADEA lending program focuses on infrastructure projects, which help in creating suitable environment for investment, increasing production in agriculture and rural development, enhancing urban and rural infrastructure which is considered as a major factor in investment promotion. In addition to this, reactivation of elements of production, creation of employment to enable the poor segments in the community to increase their income. BADEA has also provided financing to micro, small and medium enterprises through lines of credit.

==== Enhancing women role in development ====
BADEA recognizes that women play a key role in boasting social development and poverty reduction. Therefore, operations (Project, technical assistance) financed by BADEA focus on women involvement in these activities. The Bank under takes programs that enhance women participation in development, and certain operations are exclusively devoted to women, in rural area and modern sectors of production.

=== Regional Operations ===
Regional transport is considered as a major pillar in the process of regional integration since it facilitates setting up binds amongst African countries and between Africa and the Arab World. Moreover, this connection has a positive impact on the African continent promotion, by contributing to the expansion of the circle of commercial exchange, facilitating easy circulation of products between African countries as well as transportation inside and outside countries. It will also contribute to the extension of markets, creating regional or continental markets for both goods and services, and therefore achieve development in Africa. In this regard, the total allocations for financing regional operations during the period 1975-2013 amounted to US$537.7 million, directed to finance 66 regional projects, and US$7.69 million to finance 25 technical and economic feasibility studies as grants, some of which produced projects financed by BADEA.

=== Coordination and Co-Financing ===
BADEA attaches great importance to enhancing coordination with development financial institutions particularly the Arab ones, due to the financial opportunities especially for financing major projects proposed for funding by beneficiary countries. The "Arab Coordination Group" also constitutes a platform for the exchange of expertise, coordination of policies and establishment of contact with international development institutions. BADEA contributes in all meetings that regroup regional and international institutions operating in the field of development support in Africa Sub-Saharan countries.

Having reviewed the experience of cooperation over the four decades since BADEA's establishment, the organisation outlined its future plans and objectives. Drawing on its experience, BADEA aims to strengthen its role in economic and social development through improvements to its products and the expansion of its operations.
