= Marcos Prado Troyjo =

Brazilian economist (born 1966)

Marcos Troyjo
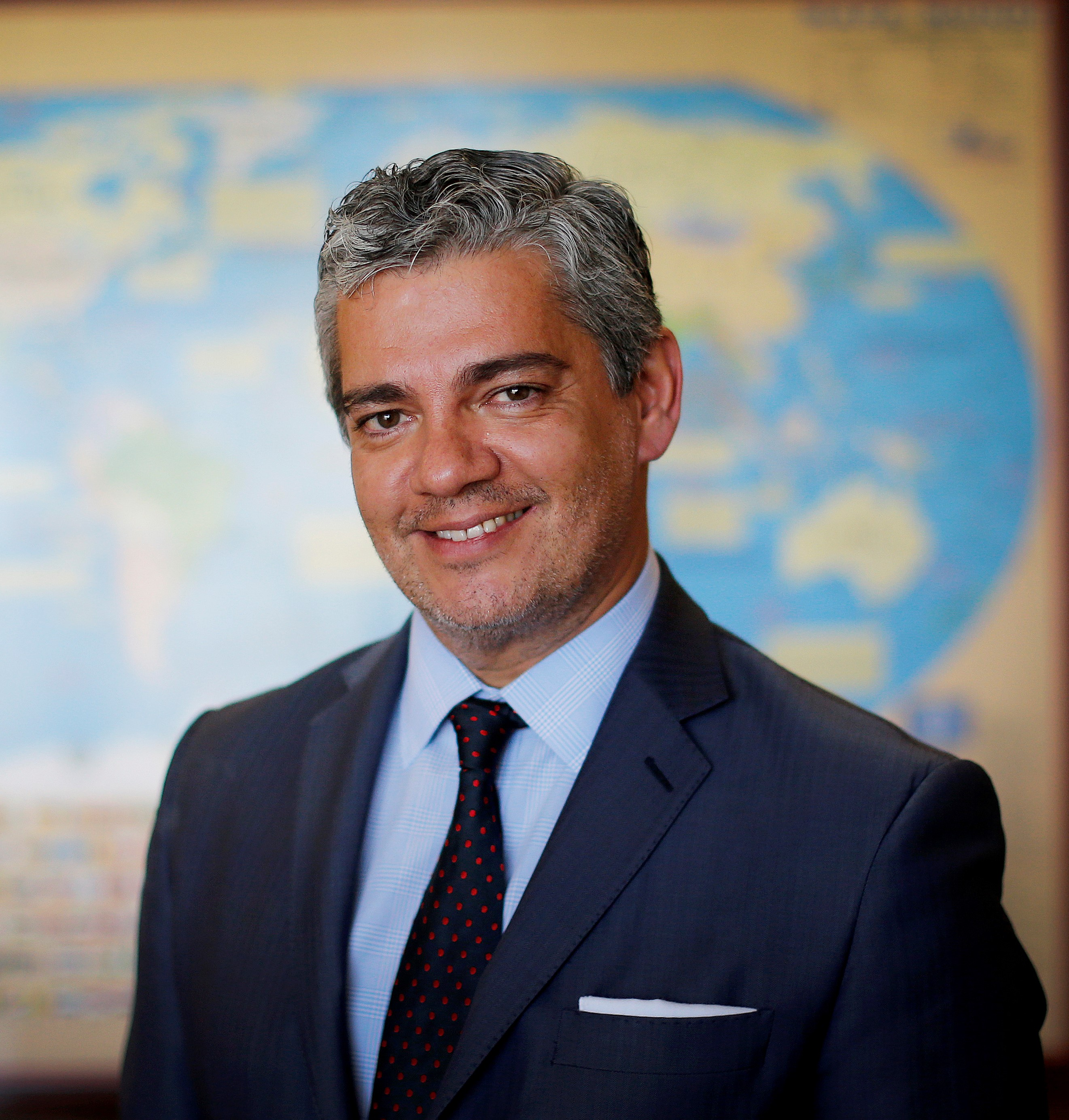

2nd Chair of the New Development Bank
- In office 27 May 2020 – 24 March 2023
- Preceded by: K. V. Kamath
- Succeeded by: Dilma Rousseff

Special Secretary for Foreign Trade and International Affairs at the Ministry of Economy
- In office 14 January 2019 – 26 June 2020
- Minister: Paulo Guedes

Personal details
- Born: Marcos Prado Troyjo; 1966 (age 59–60) São Paulo, Brazil
- Profession: Economist and diplomat

Marcos Prado Troyjo (Spanish pronunciation: [troˈixo]) is a Brazilian political economist, entrepreneur, social scientist, diplomat and writer. He is currently the MIT (Massachusetts Institute of Technology) Robert E. Wilhelm Fellow at the MIT Center for International Studies and a Distinguished Fellow at INSEAD’s Hoffmann Global Institute for Business and Society. He is a former Transformational Leadership Fellow at the University of Oxford’s Blavatnik School of Government and a Troyjo was President of the NDB, New Development Bank. He served as Brazil's Deputy Minister of the Economy, in charge of Foreign Trade & International Affairs and was one of the negotiators of the Mercosur-European Union Agreement.

He was Chairman of the Board of Directors of the NDB, where he also served as Director for Brazil. He was Brazil's Alternate Governor at the Inter-American Development Bank (IADB), a member of the World Bank's Development Committee and a representative at board level in many other multilateral development institutions.

Troyjo was also Director of the BRICLab at Columbia University, a Forum on Brazil, Russia, India and China he co-founded with Christian Deseglise. He taught at Columbia University's SIPA (School of International and Public Affairs) and is currently a Research Scholar at Columbia's Center on Global Economic Governance (CGEG). He founded and directed the Center for Business Diplomacy, an independent think-tank on education, business and global affairs.

He is a member of the World Economic Forum Global Future Council on International Trade and Investment. He was Director of the Intelligent Tech & Trade Initiative (ITTI) under the auspices of the International Chamber of Commerce, examining the impact of artificial intelligence (AI) on global trade. He holds a PhD in sociology of international relations from the University of São Paulo and did postdoctoral studies at Columbia. An economist and political scientist, Troyjo is an alumnus of The Rio Branco Institute (Instituto Rio Branco), the graduate school of international relations and diplomatic academy of Brazil's Ministry of Foreign Affairs.

He was an op-ed columnist for Folha de S.Paulo, Brazil's biggest circulation newspaper, as well as for other media outlets in Brazil and around the world. He was also foreign affairs commentator for Jovem Pan, Brazil's leading radio network. Troyjo writes extensively on foreign affairs, global trade, rising powers, globalization, Brazil's political and economic prospects and Brazilian foreign policy. He serves on the Advisory Board of numerous think-tanks and academic institutions, including CEIBS (China Europe International Business School) and Global Neighbours. He is a career diplomat and was Press Secretary at the Brazilian Mission to the United Nations in New York. He was the Brazilian speaker on World Press Freedom Day at UN Headquarters in New York in 2000–2001.

Troyjo was a visiting professor at RANEPA, the Russian Presidential Academy of National Economy and Public Administration. He was an Advisory Board member of the World Economic Forum Project on Emerging Best Practices of Brazilian Globalizers. He joined the "Leadership for the 21st Century" Program at Harvard Kennedy School. He was a Research Scholar at the Centre d`Études sur l`Actuel et le Quotidien, Université Paris Descartes (Sorbonne) and a member of the International Schumpeter Society.

Troyjo has been chosen one of "The Outstanding Young Persons of the World - TOYP" along with Queen Rania of Jordan and robotics scientist Takanori Shibata by the Junior Chamber International during its 2004 World Congress held in Fukuoka, Japan. Troyjo was the winner of the "Latin America Fellowship-2005" awarded by the Rt. Hon Helen Clark, former Prime Minister of New Zealand, and the "Invited Foreign Leader" of Japan Economic Foundation in 2012. Troyjo was a keynote speaker at the Centenary Summit of the International Chamber of Commerce (Paris, 2019). He was elected “Person of the Year in Foreign Trade 2020” by Brazil's Foundation for Foreign Trade Studies (FUNCEX).

He is the author of such books as: Deglobalization: Chronicle of a Changing World (2016), Technology & Diplomacy: Challenges for International Scientific and Technological Cooperation, Brazil: Competitiveness in the Global Marketplace, Manifesto of Business Diplomacy, Trading Nation: Power & Prosperity in the 21st Century (chosen by Americas Quarterly as one of the best new books on policy, economics and business in the hemisphere in 2007).

Troyjo has been a guest speaker at world-renowned institutions such as Harvard University, Yale University, University of Washington, Columbia University, MIT (Massachusetts Institute of Technology), Cornell University, University of Chicago, Brandeis University, Tsinghua University (China), University of International Business and Economics (China), Fudan University (China), CFAU (China Foreign Affairs University), IE-Instituto de Empresa (Spain), New Economic School (Russia), IVA-The Royal Academy of Engineering Sciences (Sweden), ICRIER-Indian Council for Research on International Economic Relations (India), Hitotsubashi University (Japan), Keio University (Japan), Canon Institute of Global Studies (Japan), Bavarian State Ministry for Economic Affairs and Media, Energy and Technology (Germany), University of Auckland (New Zealand), Canning House (UK), INSEAD (France), Kedge Business School (France), Korean National Diplomatic Academy (South Korea), Seoul National University (South Korea), the United Nations Economic Commission for Latin America and the Caribbean (Chile) and the Council on Foreign Relations.

Positions in intergovernmental organisations
Preceded by K. V. Kamath	President of the New Development Bank; 2020–2023	Succeeded by Dilma Rousseff
