= International financial institutions =

Institutions spanning several countries

An international financial institution (IFI) is a financial institution that has been established (or chartered) by more than one country, and hence is subject to international law. Its owners or shareholders are generally national governments, although other international institutions and other organizations occasionally figure as shareholders. The most prominent IFIs are creations of multiple nations, although some bilateral financial institutions (created by two countries) exist and are technically IFIs. The best known IFIs were established after World War II to assist in the reconstruction of Europe and provide mechanisms for international cooperation in managing the global financial system.

== Types ==
=== Multilateral Development Banks ===
A Multilateral Development Bank (MDB) is a development bank, created by a group of countries, that provides financing, technical assistance and professional advice to enhance development. An MDB has many members, including developed donor countries and developing borrower countries. MDBs finance projects through long-term loans at market rates, very-long-term loans below market rates (also known as credits), and grants. Additionally, MDBs often have a geographic concentration area for their development objectives. With this geographic and thematic focus, funding for a variety of ventures – often resource-intense infrastructure projects – is provided. Since MDBs have a shareholding structure and are backed by member countries, they tend to profit from favorable loan conditions compared to other banks and can therefore take more risks in their investment strategy. This aids their development-driven cause.

Since the 2020s, in the context of the G20, the World Bank-IMF Annual Meetings and other International Summits, MDBs have committed to multiple shared reform objectives. This MDBs Reform process aims to integrate MDBs in terms of operational practices, objectives, financial metrics and governance structures, enabling them to work as a system in development projects, to mobilize additional capital and achieve credit rating stability. The Capital Adequacy Framework (CAF) reform has been one of the main fields of MDB reform, aiming the enhance financing capacity and harmonize financial metrics among MDBs.

The following are usually classified as the main MDBs:

- World Bank
- European Investment Bank (EIB)
- Islamic Development Bank (IsDB)
- Asian Development Bank (ADB)
- European Bank for Reconstruction and Development (EBRD)
- Inter-American Development Bank Group (IDB, IADB)
- African Development Bank (AfDB)
- New Development Bank (NDB)
- Asian Infrastructure Investment Bank (AIIB)
- North American Development Bank (Nadbank)

There are also several multilateral financial institutions (MFIs). MFIs are similar to MDBs but they are sometimes separated since they have more limited memberships and often focus on financing certain types of projects.

- European Stability Mechanism (ESF)
- European Investment Fund (EIF)
- International Finance Facility for Immunisation (IFFIm)
- International Fund for Agricultural Development (IFAD)
- Arab Petroleum Investments Corporation (APICORP)
- OPEC Fund for International Development

=== Bretton Woods institutions ===
The best-known IFIs were established after World War II to assist in the reconstruction of Europe and provide mechanisms for international cooperation in managing the global financial system. They include the World Bank, the IMF, and the International Finance Corporation. Today the largest IFI in the world is the European Investment Bank which lent 61 billion euros to global projects in 2011.

Founded	Name	Notes	HQ
1944	IMF International Monetary Fund	Specialised agency of the UN	Washington, D.C.
1944	IBRD International Bank for Reconstruction and Development	World Bank Group, Specialised agency of the UN	Washington, D.C.
1956	IFC International Finance Corporation	World Bank Group	Washington, D.C.
1960	IDA International Development Association	World Bank Group	Washington, D.C.
1966	ICSID, International Centre for Settlement of Investment Disputes	World Bank Group	Washington, D.C.
1988	MIGA Multilateral Investment Guarantee Agency	World Bank Group	Washington, D.C.
1995	GATT General Agreement on Tariffs and Trade, basis for the creation of World Trade Organization (WTO) in 1995	The GATT is not an organisation. The WTO is not a United Nations agency	Geneva for the WTO

=== Regional development banks ===
There are also several regional multilateral development banks. Their membership typically includes only borrowing nations. The banks lend to their members, borrowing from the international capital markets. Because there is effectively shared responsibility for repayment, the banks can often borrow more cheaply than could any one member nation. These banks include: Regional development banks consist of several regional institutions that have functions similar to the World Bank group's activities, but with particular focus on a specific region. Some banks consist of the regional countries plus the major donor countries. The best-known of these regional banks cover regions that roughly correspond to United Nations regional groupings, including the Inter-American Development Bank, the Asian Development Bank; the Islamic Development Bank; the African Development Bank; the Central American Bank for Economic Integration; the European Investment Bank; and the European Bank for Reconstruction and Development.

Founded	Name	Notes	HQ
1958	CEB Council of Europe Development Bank	Coordinated organisation granting loans to member states in Europe	Paris
1958	EIB European Investment Bank	Created by European Union member states to provide long-term finance, mainly in the EU	Luxembourg
1959	IDB Interamerican Development Bank	Works in the Americas, but primarily for development in Latin America and the Caribbean	Washington, D.C.
1960	CABEI Central American Bank for Economic Integration	Central America	Tegucigalpa
1963	IBEC International Bank for Economic Co-operation	Development bank of the former Comecon	Moscow
1964	AfDB African Development Bank	Africa	Abidjan
1966	ADB Asian Development Bank	Asia	Manila
1967	EADB East African Development Bank	Development bank of the East African Community	Kampala
1969	CDB Caribbean Development Bank	Development bank of the Caribbean	Barbados
1970	CAF Development Bank of Latin America	Latin America	Caracas
1973	IsDB Islamic Development Bank Group	56 countries in Asia, Africa, Europe, and Latin America	Jeddah
1973	BADEA Arab Bank for Economic Development in Africa	www.badea.org	Khartoum
1973	BOAD West African Development Bank	Development bank of the West African Economic and Monetary Union	Lomé
1970	IIB International Investment Bank	Consists of 4 member countries	Moscow
1975	BDEAC Development Bank of Central African States	Development bank of Economic Community of Central African States	Brazzaville
1976	NIB Nordic Investment Bank	Lending operations in its 8 member countries and emerging markets on all continents.	Helsinki
1985	TDB Trade and Development Bank	Development bank of the Common Market for Eastern and Southern Africa	Bujumbura
1991	EBRD European Bank for Reconstruction and Development		London
1997	BSTDB Black Sea Trade and Development Bank	11 member countries, corresponding to the Organization of the Black Sea Economic Cooperation	Thessaloniki
2005	ETDB Economic Cooperation Organization Trade and Development Bank	Development bank of the Economic Cooperation Organization	Istanbul
2006	EDB Eurasian Development Bank	International financial institution promoting economic growth in the member states and Eurasian integration through investment.	Almaty

=== Other regional financial institutions ===
Financial institutions of neighboring countries established themselves internationally to pursue and finance activities in areas of mutual interest; most of them are central banks, followed by development and investment banks. The table below lists some of them in chronological order of when they were founded or listed as functioning as a legal entity. Some institutions were conceived and started working informally 2 decades before their legal inception (e.g. the South East Asian Central Banks Centre)

Founded	Name	Website	Notes	HQ
1930	BIS Bank for International Settlements	http://www.bis.org	The bank of all central banks, 60 members	Basel, Switzerland
1959	BCEAO Central Bank of West African States		Central bank of the West African Economic and Monetary Union	Lomé
1965	AACB African Association of Central Banks	http://www.aacb.org/	Consists of 40 African central banks	Dakar, Senegal
1972	BEAC Bank of Central African States		Central bank of CEMAC	Yaoundé
1974	ACU Asian Clearing Union	https://www.asianclearingunion.org/	9 Central Banks	
1982	SEACEN South East Asian Central Banks Research and Training Centre	http://www.seacen.org	19 Asian central banks	Kuala Lumpur, Malaysia
1998	ECB European Central Bank	http://www.ecb.int	Central bank of the eurozone	Frankfurt, Germany

=== Bilateral development banks and agencies ===
A bilateral development bank is a financial institution set up by one individual country to finance development projects in a developing country and its emerging market, hence the term bilateral, as opposed to multilateral. Examples include:

- the Netherlands Development Finance Company FMO, headquarters in The Hague; one of the largest bilateral development banks worldwide.
- the DEG German Investment Corporation or Deutsche Investitions- und Entwicklungsgesellschaft, headquartered in Cologne, Germany.
- the French Development Agency, and Caisse des dépôts, founded 1816, both headquartered in Paris, France.
- the British International Investment, is a development finance institution owned by the UK Government headquartered in London.

== See also ==
- Climate Investment Funds
- Development finance institution
- Financial Stability Board
- Global financial system
- List of national development banks
