= Development finance institution =

Banking company that provides risk capital for economic development projects

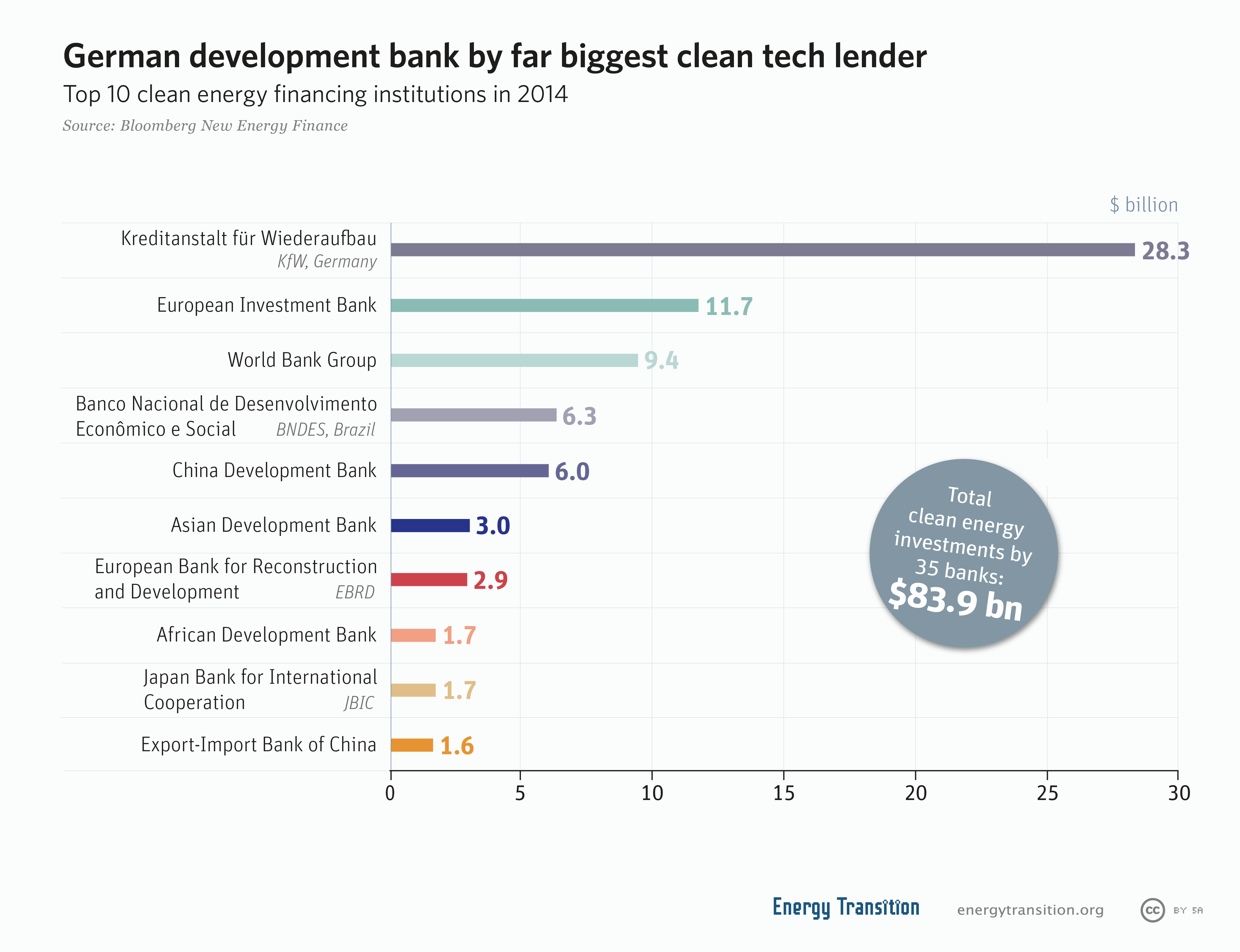
Top 10 clean energy financing institutions 2014

Development finance institution (DFI), also known as a development bank, is a financial institution that provides risk capital for economic development projects on a non-commercial basis.

DFIs are often established and owned by governments or nonprofit organizations to finance projects that would otherwise not be able to get financing from commercial lenders.

They are often structured as a company that provides loans for projects that a government or nonprofit wants to encourage for non commercial reasons. They can be at a local, regional, national, or international level. DFIs include multilateral development banks, national development banks, bilateral development banks, microfinance institutions, community development financial institution and revolving loan funds.

== Mandate ==
DFIs can play a crucial role in financing private and public sector investments in developing countries, in the form of higher risk loans, equity positions, and guarantees.

DFIs often provide finance to the private sector for investments that promote development and to help companies to invest, especially in countries with various restrictions on the market.

=== Climate financing ===
As of November 2020, development banks and private finance had not reached the US$100 billion per year investment of climate financing stipulated in the UN climate negotiations for 2020. However, in the face of the COVID-19 pandemic's economic downturn, 450 development banks pledged to fund a "Green recovery" in developing countries.

== Typology ==
Development banks include:

- Community development banks which fund low-income areas in the United States
- Land development banks which provide financing to develop agriculture in India
- National development banks are government-owned financial institution that provides financing for economic development.
- International financial institutions conducting development-oriented finance on a bilateral or multilateral basis
- Multilateral development bank are development banks set up by a group of countries and often operate under international laws.

== Financial instruments ==
Development finance institutions typically use a range of financial instruments to support economic development projects, including loans, equity investments, guarantees, grants, and technical assistance.

Compared with commercial lenders, DFIs often take on higher levels of risk and may provide longer maturities or concessional terms in order to finance projects with significant development impact. The World Bank has noted that national development financial institutions are typically government-owned or government-controlled financial institutions with a public policy mandate to provide long-term finance in support of development objectives.

== List of development finance institutions (incomplete) ==
- African Development Bank
- Albanian Development Bank
- Asian Development Bank
- Asian Infrastructure Investment Bank
- Bank of Industry Limited (Nigeria)
- Bank of the South
- Black Sea Trade and Development Bank
- British Business Bank
- British International Investment
- Caribbean Development Bank
- Central American Bank for Economic Integration
- Council of Europe Development Bank
- Development Bank of Latin America and the Caribbean
- Eurasian Development Bank
- European Bank for Reconstruction and Development
- European Investment Bank
- FinDev Canada
- German Investment Corporation
- Inter-American Development Bank
- Islamic Development Bank
- Netherlands Development Finance Company
- New Development Bank
- Proparco (France)
- U.S. International Development Finance Corporation
- World Bank

== See also ==
- International financial institutions
- Economic development
- Development aid
- Village banking
