= FinDev Canada =

Development finance institution of Canada

- Formation: 2018
- Legal status: Crown Corporation
- Headquarters: Montréal (Canada)
- Owner: Export Development Canada
- CEO: Lori Kerr
- Website: findevcanada.ca

FinDev Canada is Canada's development finance institution (DFI) set up in 2018. It has US$1 billion on its balance sheet. Its purpose is to provide direct and indirect development financing consistent with Canada's international development priorities. The DFI is wholly owned by Canada's export credit agency, Export Development Canada (EDC). FinDev was set up amid the expansion of development banks by other donors, including the United States, United Kingdom, and Denmark. Its CEO Lori Kerr hails from the World Bank.
