= Federal Financial Markets Service =

Russian federal executive body

- Федеральная служба по финансовым рынкам

Agency overview
- Formed: March 1, 2004
- Dissolved: September 1, 2013
- Superseding agency: Central Bank of Russia
- Jurisdiction: Russian Federation
- Headquarters: Moscow, Russia
- Agency executive: Dmitry Pankin, Head
- Website: http://www.fcsm.ru/

The Federal Financial Markets Service (FFMS, FSFR) (Russian: Федеральная служба по финансовым рынкам, ФСФР) was a Russian federal executive body which regulated Russian financial markets and operated from 2004 until it was disbanded in 2013. Its functions were taken over by the Central Bank of Russia.

The agency covered securities issuance, trading, supervision of exchanges, issuers, professional market participants and their Self-Regulatory Organisations; the Russian Federation Pension Fund; the State management company. A major social role of FFMS was to promote public understanding of securities laws and their practical application.

== History ==
The FFMS was established by President Vladimir Putin's Decree No. 314 dated 9 March 2004 "On the System and Structure of Federal Executive Branch Agencies". FFMS received the functions of the former Federal Fund Market Commission of Russia (Федеральная комиссия по рынку ценных бумаг), as well as some responsibilities of the former Ministry of Labour and Social Development of Russia and former Ministry of Antitrust Policy of Russia as well as the Russian Ministry of Finance.

On September 1, 2013, the service was abolished and its functions transferred to the Central Bank of Russia in accordance with the Presidential Decree number 645 25.7.2013.

From March 23, 2004, to May 10, 2007, Oleg Vyugin was the Head of the FFMS. His four deputies was: Vladislav Streltsov, Sergei Kharlamov, Bembya Khulkhachiev and Vladimir Gusakov. He was followed by Vladimir Milovidov from May 10, 2007. He was followed by Dmitry Pankin from 2011.

== Structure ==
Headquartered in Moscow, the FFMS was a part of the Russian Government. The FFMS had 13 regional authorities: in St. Petersburg, Ekaterinburg, Novosibirsk, Nizhny Novgorod, Rostov, Vladivostok, Krasnoyarsk, Oryol, Omsk, Samara, Chelyabinsk, Saratov and Irkutsk.

There were thirteen departments and three independent divisions within the FFMS:

1. Regulation and control over the collective investment department.
2. Regulation of financial market participants department.
3. Securities department.
4. Surveillance activities in the securities market department.
5. Financial market regulation department.
6. Information and monitoring of the financial market department.
7. Preliminary control of the insurance market department.
8. Economic analysis and control of the reliability of reporting by insurance companies department.
9. Insurance supervision and monitoring of solvency-restoration procedures department.
10. Legal department.
11. Administration and archives department.
12. Economics, finance and accounting department.
13. Information technology and economic support department.
