= Export Development Canada =

Export credit agency

- Type: Crown corporation
- Industry: Banking, financial services, credit insurance
- Founded: 1944 in Ottawa, Ontario, Canada
- Headquarters: Ottawa, Ontario, Canada
- Key people: Alison Nankivell (President and CEO)
- Services: corporate banking
- Total assets: $60.4 billion (2018)
- Number of employees: 1,556 (2018)
- Website: edc.ca

Export Development Canada (EDC; French: Exportation et développement Canada) is Canada's export credit agency and a Crown corporation wholly owned by the Government of Canada. Its mandate is to support and develop trade between Canada and other countries, and help Canada's competitiveness in the international marketplace.

EDC products and services include trade credit insurance, export financing for Canadian companies and for their foreign customers, equity investments, bonding products, international market expertise, as well as information on opportunities in international markets.

EDC was founded in 1944. Its corporate headquarters is located in Ottawa, Ontario, and it has 21 regional offices across Canada and permanent representations in 21 cities in 15 foreign markets.

EDC also owns FinDev Canada, the governmental development bank set up in 2018.

== History ==
=== Founding (1944-2017) ===
In 1944, the Export Credits Insurance Act was proclaimed. Export Credit Insurance Corporation (ECIC) was created following WWII to help stimulate the Canadian economy, create jobs and help Canadian exporters. In the 1940s, EDC began acting as a "trade facilitator for Canadian businesses doing deals abroad."

The Export Development Act proclaimed on October 1, 1969, repealed Part 1 of the Export Credits Insurance Act and established the Export Development Corporation (EDC) as successor to all property, rights, and obligations.

In 2001, EDC changed its name from Export Development Corporation to Export Development Canada.

In 2014, EDC joined the loan party and announced it would be giving US$500 million to Reliance Industries, the largest private company in India, a move criticized by Maclean's. EDC in 2016 provided $1.2 billion in Canadian dollars in financing, and in 2017, was looking to provide loans worth CAD$1.3 billion to businesses in India. EDC had previously financed Tata Steel, Tata Communications, and Ultratech Cement, and over the past five years had done business worth $10 billion. In 2017, it lent $215 million to Idea Cellular in India.

=== Recent history (2018-2021) ===
In 2018, the Office of the Auditor General of Canada stated "significant deficiencies" had been found in relation to risk management at EDC, after Above Ground found EDC did not have "effective screening for corruption," according to the National Observer.

Research in late 2018 found that EDC gave "12 times as much financial backing to oil and gas companies as it did to clean technology companies over the last five years." In May 2019, Oil Change International ranked EDC second in the world after China in "support for fossil fuels" financially, averaging $10 billion a year. In 2019 EDC launched a review of a 2011 deal with SNC-Lavalin, over allegations the latter had been using money loaned by EDC for bribery purposes.

In October 2020, EDC predicted a 2021 global rebound after coronavirus. In 2020, EDC had bookmarked $2 billion to spend by 2023 in support of women-owned businesses "looking to export." In February 2021, Garuda Indonesia was negotiating with EDC for "an early settlement" on the lease of six Bombardier planes with a contract ending in 2024. Also that year, EDC loaned $500 million to Vale, after lending Vale $1 billion in 2010.

== Operations ==
=== Business model ===
EDC operates at arm's length from the federal government and according to commercial principles. EDC's mandate is spelled out in the Export Development Act. In response to the global credit crunch, in 2009, the Government of Canada broadened EDC's mandate and scope of activity for a two-year period to include support for domestic trade and domestic business opportunities. The period was extended to March 12, 2014.

The corporation is financially self-sustaining. EDC raises funds by charging fees for its services and interest on its loans, as well as issuing debt in capital markets.

EDC operates according to a Corporate Plan approved annually by the federal government, and its Operating Principles dictate that it conducts its business in a manner that is respectful of applicable international agreements to which Canada is a party; is consistent with its Corporate Sustainability Responsibility (CSR) commitments; and ensures the sound financial management of its activities.

In 2011, EDC and BDC (Business Development Bank of Canada) announced the signing of a new protocol to coordinate collaborative efforts between the two Crown corporations to better benefit Canadian businesses.

=== Publications ===
EDC publishes an online magazine for Canadian Exporters, ExportWise (Exportateurs avertis in French).

=== Locations ===
In addition to the Ottawa headquarters, EDC operates from 20 regional offices in Toronto, Kitchener, London, Mississauga, Windsor, Vancouver, Calgary, Edmonton, Regina, Saskatoon, Winnipeg, Montreal, Sherbrooke, Brossard, Drummondville, Quebec, Saint-Laurent, Halifax, Moncton, St. John's, Charlottetown; as well as from 21 offices abroad including in; Australia, Brazil, Chile, China, Colombia, Germany, India, Mexico, Peru, South Africa, Singapore, Turkey, the UAE, the United Kingdom and the United States.

=== Executive team ===
As of March 2023

- Mairead Lavery - President and CEO
- Carl Burlock - EVP and Chief Business Officer
- Lorraine Audsley - SVP and Chief Sustainability Officer
- Jacques Chamberland - SVP and Chief Transformation Officer
- Guillermo Freire - SVP, Mid-Market
- Sven List - SVP, Corporate and International
- Sameer Madhok - SVP, Chief Internal Auditor and Senior Officer for Internal Disclosure
- Dan Mancuso - SVP, Special Advisor
- Scott Moore - SVP, Finance and Chief Financial Officer
- Julie Pottier - SVP, Small Business, Partnerships and Head of Insurance
- Liette Vigneault - SVP, People and Culture
- Todd Winterhalt - SVP, Communications and Corporate Strategy

== Services ==
EDC provides trade credit insurance and export financial services, bonding products and small business solutions to Canadian exporters and investors and their international buyers. EDC also supports Canadian direct investment abroad and investment into Canada. Much of its business is done in partnership with other financial institutions and through collaboration with the government of Canada.

EDC offers services for companies wanting to grow their business internationally, secure financing, invest or get financing, or other ends.

== Governance ==
EDC is governed by a board of directors composed of representatives primarily from the private sector. The Board's responsibility is to supervise the direction and management of EDC. The Board reports to Parliament through the Minister for International Trade. Board members are appointed by the Government of Canada.

=== Board of directors ===
As of March 2023

- Abdelmessih, V. (Chair)
- Boivin, P.
- Culbert, H.
- Gupta, K.
- MacWilliam, K.
- Matuszewski, P.
- McLeese, R.
- Payette, R.
- Sharma, M.
- Stairs Krishnappa, A.
- Yuers, K.

== Sustainability and programs ==
Corporate Sustainability and Responsibility is an operating principle at EDC, and it has a partnership with CARE Canada.

It has a youth education program, with the "International Business Scholarships." EDC awards up to 30 scholarships annually, 25 of which go to undergraduate university or college students interested in international business, with up to 5 additional scholarships for students in programs which combine business with environmental or sustainability studies. An EDC scholarship is worth a $4,000 cash award.

== Events by EDC ==
EDC participates in a number of events, both their own hosted and partnered events.

EDC events include "Lets Talk Exports." Each spring, EDC's vice-president and chief economist travels across Canada to share his view on the global economy. There is also the "Global Export Forecast", by EDC's vice-president and chief economist, produced twice per year in April and October.
