= International Center for Black Sea Studies =

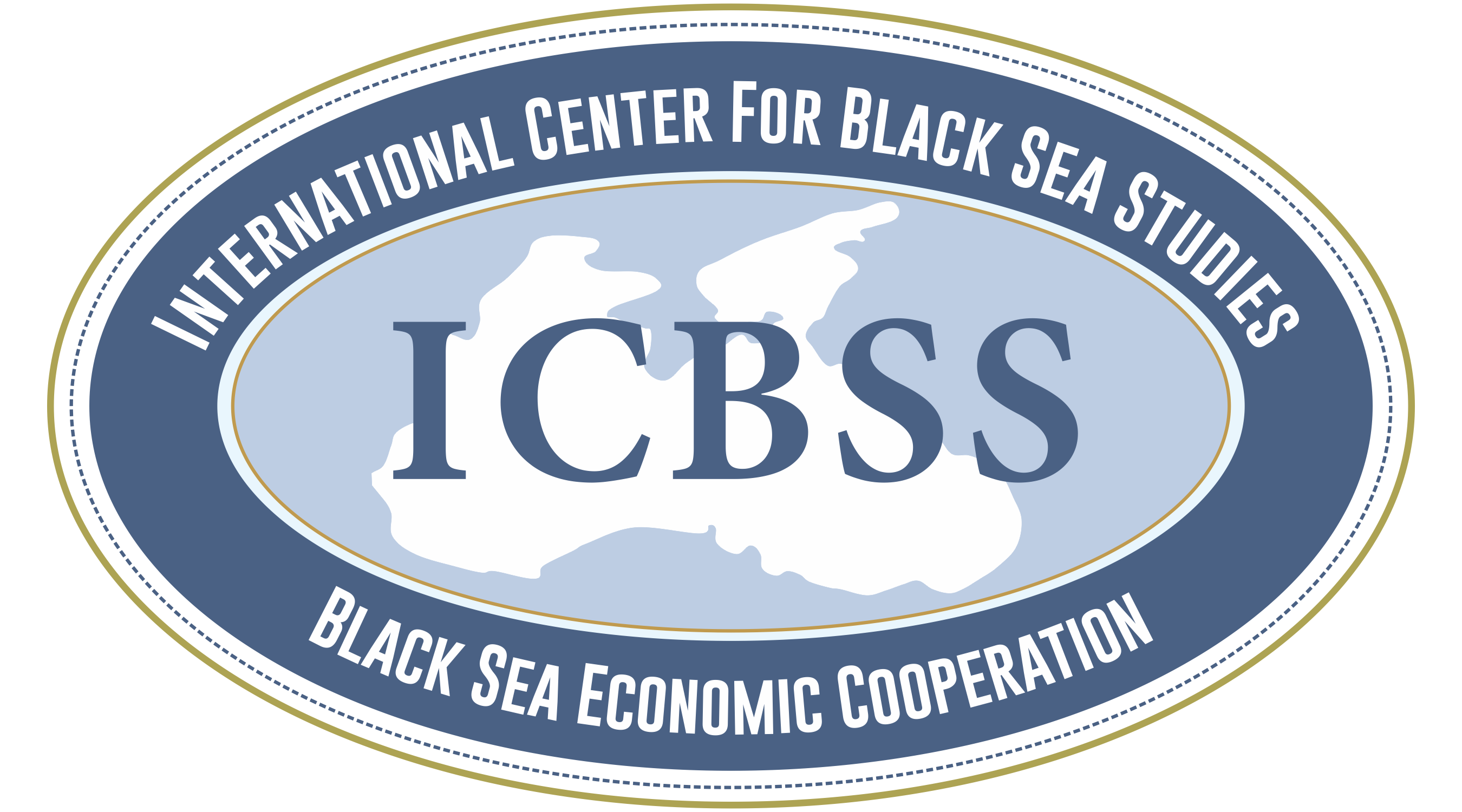
- Abbreviation: ICBSS
- Formation: 1998
- Type: International Relations, Think Tank
- Headquarters: 19 - 21 Arachovis str. & Ippokratous, 10680
- Location: Athens, Greece
- Director General: Georgios Mitrakos
- Affiliations: Organization of the Black Sea Economic Cooperation
- Website: https://icbss.org/

The International Center for Black Sea Studies (Greek: Διεθνές Κέντρο Μελετών Ευξείνου Πόντου, English Acronym: ICBSS, Greek Acronym: ΔΙ.ΚΕ.Μ.Ε.Π.) is a research center based in Athens, Greece, focused on promoting multilateral cooperation among the countries in the Black Sea region.

== Events and conferences ==
- International Black Sea Symposium: Launched in 2008, the IBSS serves as a platform for dialogue and knowledge transfer aimed at enhancing existing synergies, promoting further regional cooperation in social and economic programs.
- BSEC Month of Culture: The ICBSS launched the BSEC Month of Culture (MoC) in 2017, with the aim of promoting the region's cultural identity. The MoC is an online program of cultural highlights in performing arts, cinema, literature, painting, architecture, and gastronomy from the 13 BSEC Member-States. The event takes place online from November 1 to 30 each year.

== Research ==
The center undertakes a number of projects, often in collaboration with regional and international partners, aimed at promoting cooperation and policy coordination in various fields such as tourism, culture, the blue economy, science and technology, environmental policy, skills development, women and youth empowerment, etc.

== See also ==
- Organization of the Black Sea Economic Cooperation
- Black Sea Trade and Development Bank
- Parliamentary Assembly of the Black Sea Economic Cooperation
- Ministry of Foreign Affairs of Greece
