= Oleg Vyugin =

Russian economist and professor

- Олег Вьюгин

Personal details
- Born: Oleg Vyugin; 29 July 1952 (age 73) Russian SFSR, Soviet Union
- Education: Moscow State University

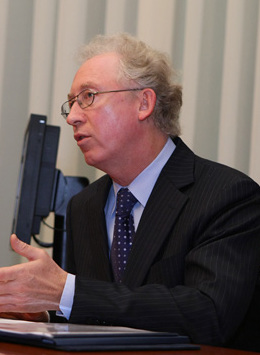
Oleg Vyugin, 2008

Oleg Vyacheslavovich Vyugin (Russian: Олег Вячеславович Вьюгин; born July 29, 1952) is a Russian economist and Professor at the National Research University Higher School of Economics. He was formerly the head of the Russian Federal Financial Markets Service and chairman of the Moscow Exchange.

== Education and early career ==
Mr. Vyugin graduated from the Moscow State University in 1974. In 1977 he completed his graduate studies in physics and mathematics the same university.

From to 1978 to 1988 Vyugin worked as an academic at various economic research institutes.

From 1989 to 1993, he was Chief Researcher at the Russian Academy of Sciences’ Institute of Economic Forecasting.

In 1993, Mr. Vyugin was appointed Head of the Macroeconomic Policy Department at the Russian Ministry of Finance. In 1994, he became a member of the board of the Ministry of Finance. From 1996 to 1999, he served as Deputy Minister of Finance, and in 1999 was appointed First Deputy Minister. In 1999, Mr. Vyugin became Chief Economist and Executive Vice President of Troika Dialog.

In 2002, he was appointed First Deputy Chairman of the Central Bank of Russia responsible for monetary policy.

== Head of the Federal Financial Markets Service ==
On March 23, 2004, Mr. Vyugin was appointed Head of the Federal Financial Markets Service (FFMS). He was regarded as a reformer and has implemented several changes to Federal laws to facilitate public offerings in the Russian market. He is a strong supporter of the domestic stock markets and criticised both issuers and investment banks for listing companies with predominantly Russian assets on foreign exchanges without listing in Russia. On May 10, 2007, Vyugin left his position in the Federal Financial Markets Service, succeeded by Vladimir Milovidov.

== Headed the Board of Directors of bank MDM-Bank ==
In 2007, Oleg Vyugin headed the Board of Directors of the non-state private bank MDM-Bank, which he left in 2016 after change of controlling shareholder.

== Chairman of Moscow Exchange ==
Mr. Vyugin was elected Chairman of the Supervisory Board of Moscow Exchange in April 2018. In 2022 he left Supervisory Board of the Moscow Exchange.

== 2020 International Stock Exchange Forum ==
Oleg Vyugin been the Head of Supervisory Board of Moscow Stock Exchange held the online public moderation with audience on 2020 International Stock Exchange Forum

== More reading ==
- Federal Financial Markets Service official web-site
- Federal Financial Markets Service press-release
