= K. V. Kamath =

Indian banker

Kundapur Vaman Kamath
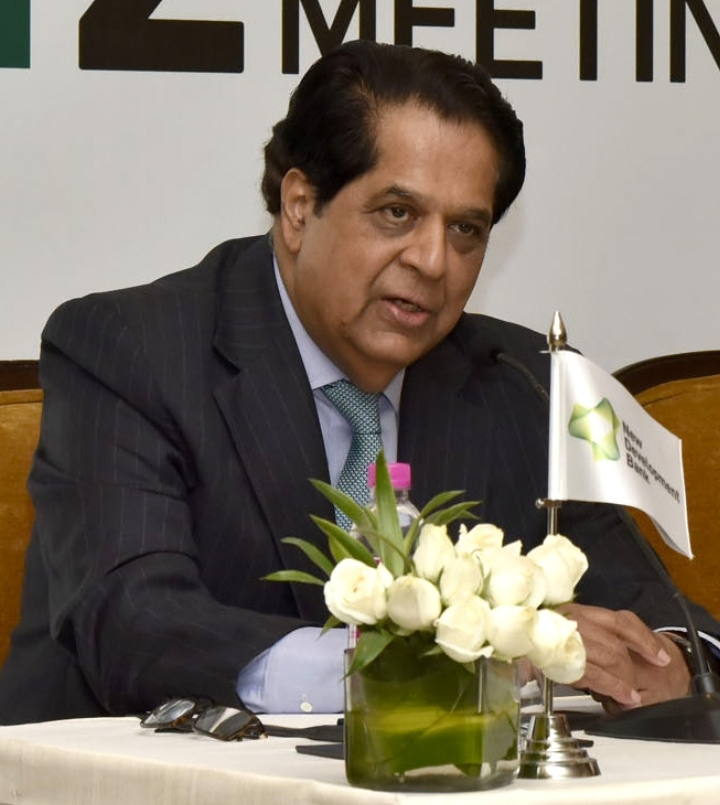

1st Chair of the New Development Bank
- In office 11 May 2015 – 27 May 2020
- Preceded by: Office established
- Succeeded by: Marcos Prado Troyjo

MD and CEO of ICICI Bank
- In office 1996–2009
- Succeeded by: Chanda Kochhar

Personal details
- Born: 2 December 1947 (age 78) Mangalore, Province of Madras, Dominion of India (present-day Karnataka, India)
- Spouse: Rajalaxmi
- Children: Ajay Kamath (son); Ajnya Kamath Pai (daughter)
- Education: NITK; IIM Ahmedabad
- Occupation: former Independent director at Infosys former MD and CEO of ICICI Bank
- Awards: Padma Bhushan

Kundapur Vaman Kamath is an Indian banker and executive who is the current Independent Director and Non-Executive Chairman of Jio Financial Services and the former chief of the New Development Bank of BRICS countries. He previously served as the Chairman of Infosys Limited, and as the Non-Executive Chairman of ICICI Bank. Kamath also served as ICICI Bank's founder and Managing Director and CEO from 1 May 1996 until his retirement from executive responsibilities on 30 April 2009.

Kamath took charge as the Chairman of Infosys from N. R. Narayana Murthy on 21 August 2011. He remained Chairman till June 2015. Before serving in this position, he was the Non-Executive Chairman of the company from 2 May 2011.

Kamath also serves as an independent director on the boards of the Houston-based oil services company Schlumberger since 2010, and the Indian pharmaceutical manufacturer Lupin. He is also a member of the Board of Governors of the Pandit Deendayal Petroleum University.

== Early life ==
Kamath was born on 2 December 1947 in Mangalore, Karnataka State. His family hails from the town of Kundapur in Karnataka, and his father's name was Vishwanath Kamath. His mother-tongue is Konkani and he also speaks Tulu, Kannada and English fluently. He spent most of his early years in Mangalore, and attended a Kannada-medium government school.

After matriculation, he completed his PUC (Pre-University), which at that time was only one year in length, at St. Aloysius College. After completing his PUC, he joined National Institute of Technology Karnataka, Surathkal (known at that time as Karnataka Regional Engineering College) for a bachelor's degree in Mechanical Engineering. After graduating from NIT Surathkal in 1969, he joined the Indian Institute of Management, Ahmedabad (IIM-A) for a Post Graduate Diploma in Management.

== Career ==
After graduating from IIM Ahmedabad in 1971, Kamath started his career with ICICI (Industrial Credit and Investment Corporation of India) in the Project Finance division and moved on to different departments to gather experience, including establishing new business lines such as leasing, venture capital, and credit ratings as well as handling general management responsibilities. As part of his general management responsibilities, he initiated and implemented ICICI's computerisation program. Substantial investments in technology from those early years have resulted in systems that are today a competitive advantage for ICICI. Kamath has generally been credited with expanding ICICI's businesses to evolve it into a technology-enabled financial organisation catering to the financial needs of corporate and retail customers.

In 1988, Kamath joined the Asian Development Bank, Manila in their Private Sector department. His principal work experience at ADB was in various projects in China, India, Indonesia, Philippines, Bangladesh, and Vietnam. He was the ADB representative on the boards of several companies.

In May 1996, Kamath returned to ICICI as its managing director and chief executive officer. Kamath was instrumental in expanding the Group's services to the retail customers. He initiated a process of a series of acquisitions of non-banking finance companies in 1996–98 and led the way to the formation of ICICI Bank.

On 2 May 2011, he was appointed as Non-Executive Chairman of the second-largest software exporter, Infosys Ltd. (earlier Infosys Technologies Ltd.).

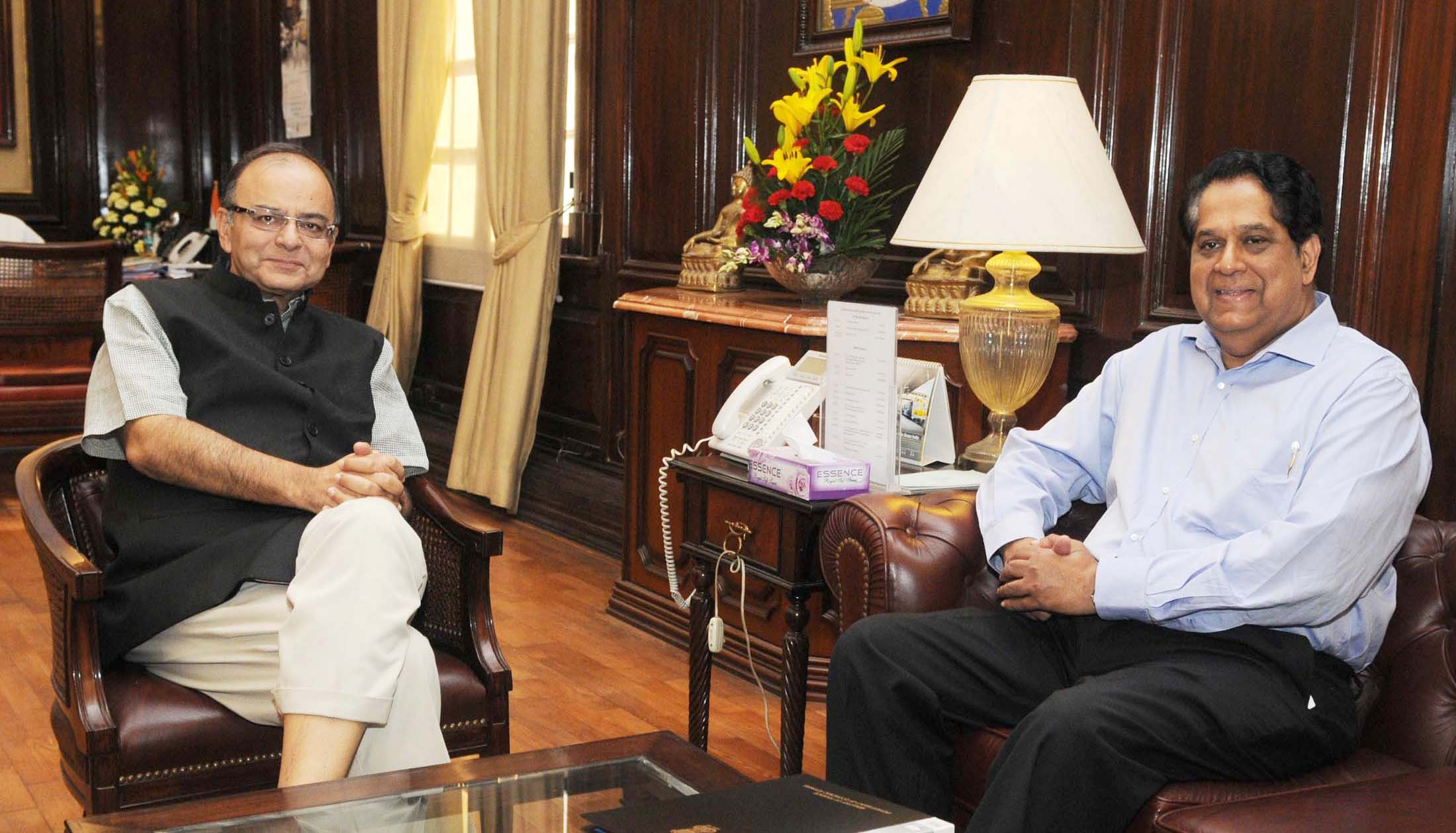
The Chairman ICICI and the President Designate BRICS Bank, Shri K.V. Kamath calls on the Union Minister for Finance, Corporate Affairs and Information & Broadcasting, Shri Arun Jaitley, in New Delhi on May 18, 2015.

He currently is a Lead independent director at Infosys after having stepped down from chairmanship to make way for N. R. Narayana Murthy. He is designated to be non-executive chairman of Infosys Board, effective 11 October 2014. After being appointed as the first chief of the New Development Bank set up by the BRICS, he went on to step down from this post of Chairman and Independent Director effective 5 June 2015.

He is appointed as the Chairman of the newly constituted development finance institution National Bank for Financing Infrastructure and Development (NaBFID).

He is also the Chairman and Independent Director of Jio Financial Services Limited.

== Board membership ==
Kamath is a member of the Governing Boards of several educational institutions, including the Indian Institute of Management Ahmedabad, Indian School of Business, National Institute of Bank Management, Pandit Deendayal Petroleum University, Gandhinagar and the Manipal Academy of Higher Education. He was the Chairman of Governing Board at Indian Institute of Management Indore, until his appointment to the New Development Bank of BRICS countries. Deepak Satvalekar replaced him.

Kamath is also a member of the National Council of Confederation of Indian Industry (CII).

He also serves on the boards of Schlumberger, Houston-based oil services company, and Lupin, an Indian pharmaceutical manufacturer.

== Awards ==
- Padma Bhushan Award from the Indian government – 2008
- Most e-savvy CEO amongst Asian Banks – The Asian Banker Journal of Singapore
- Finance Man of the Year Award – The Mumbai Management Association
- Best CEO for Innovative HR Practices – World HRD Congress
- Asian Business Leader of the Year – Asian Business Leader Award 2001 (CNBC Asia)
- Outstanding Business Leader of the Year – CNBC-TV18, 2006
- Businessman of the Year – Business India, 2005
- Business Leader Award of the Year – The Economic Times, 2007
- Businessman of the Year – Forbes Asia
- Lifetime Achievement Award at EY Entrepreneur of the Year Awards 2024
