= New Development Bank =

Multilateral development bank of the BRICS member countries

Coordinates: 31°11′21″N 121°29′45″E

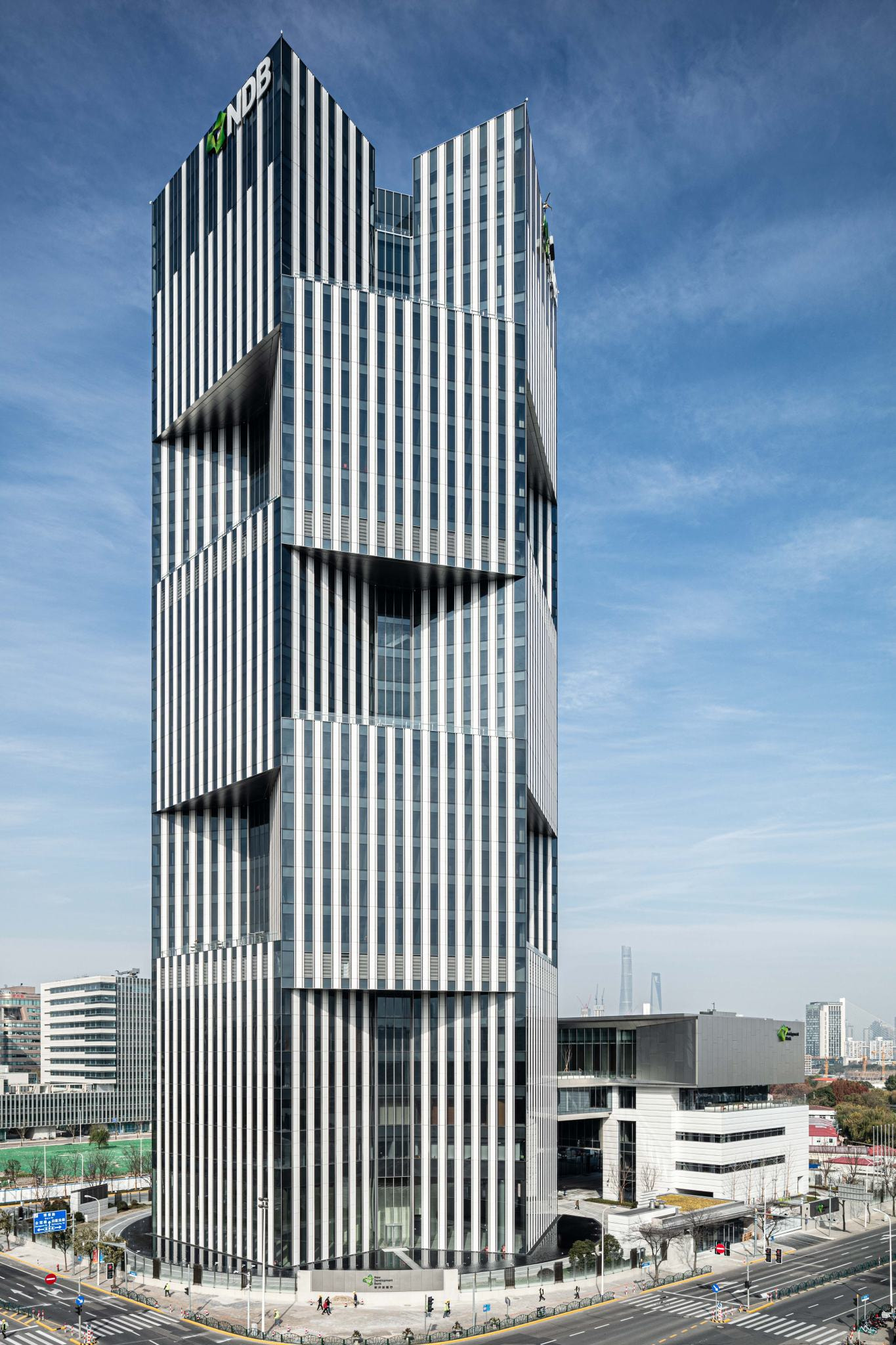
- NDB headquarters in Shanghai, China
- Abbreviation: NDB
- Formation: July 2014 (Inaugurated); July 2015; 11 years ago (Official)
- Type: International financial institution
- Legal status: Treaty
- Headquarters: Shanghai, China
- Members: Brazil; Russia; India; China; South Africa; Algeria; Bangladesh; Egypt; United Arab Emirates; Uzbekistan
- Official language: English
- President: Dilma Rousseff
- Parent organization: BRICS
- Website: www.ndb.int

The New Development Bank (NDB), formerly referred to as the BRICS Development Bank, is a multilateral development bank established by the BRICS nations (Brazil, Russia, India, China, and South Africa). According to the agreement, "the bank shall support public or private projects through loans, guarantees, equity participation and other financial instruments" and "shall cooperate with international organizations and other financial entities, and provide technical assistance for projects to be supported by the bank."

The initial authorized capital of the bank was US$100 billion divided into one million shares having a par value of US$100,000 each. The initial subscribed capital of the bank was US$50 billion divided into US$10 billion in paid-in shares and US$40 billion in callable shares. It was equally distributed among the five founding members–Brazil, Russia, India, China, South Africa. The agreement on the NDB specifies that each founding member will have one vote and that no member would have any veto powers.

The bank is headquartered in Shanghai, China. The first regional office of the bank was opened in Johannesburg, South Africa in 2016. Subsequently, regional offices were established in São Paulo in Brazil, Ahmedabad in India and Moscow in Russia.

== History ==
The idea for setting up the bank was proposed by India at the 4th BRICS summit in 2012 held in New Delhi. As the establishment of a development bank would help in simplifying mutual settlement and lending operations amongst the BRICS nations, reducing dependence on the US dollar and the Euro, the leaders of these nations agreed to set up anew multilateral development bank at the 5th BRICS summit held in Durban, South Africa on 27 March 2013. On 15 July 2014, on the first day of the 6th BRICS summit held in Fortaleza, Brazil, the five member states signed the agreement on the New Development Bank, which made provisions for the legal basis of the bank. In a separate agreement, a reserve currency pool worth US$100 billion was set up by the members.

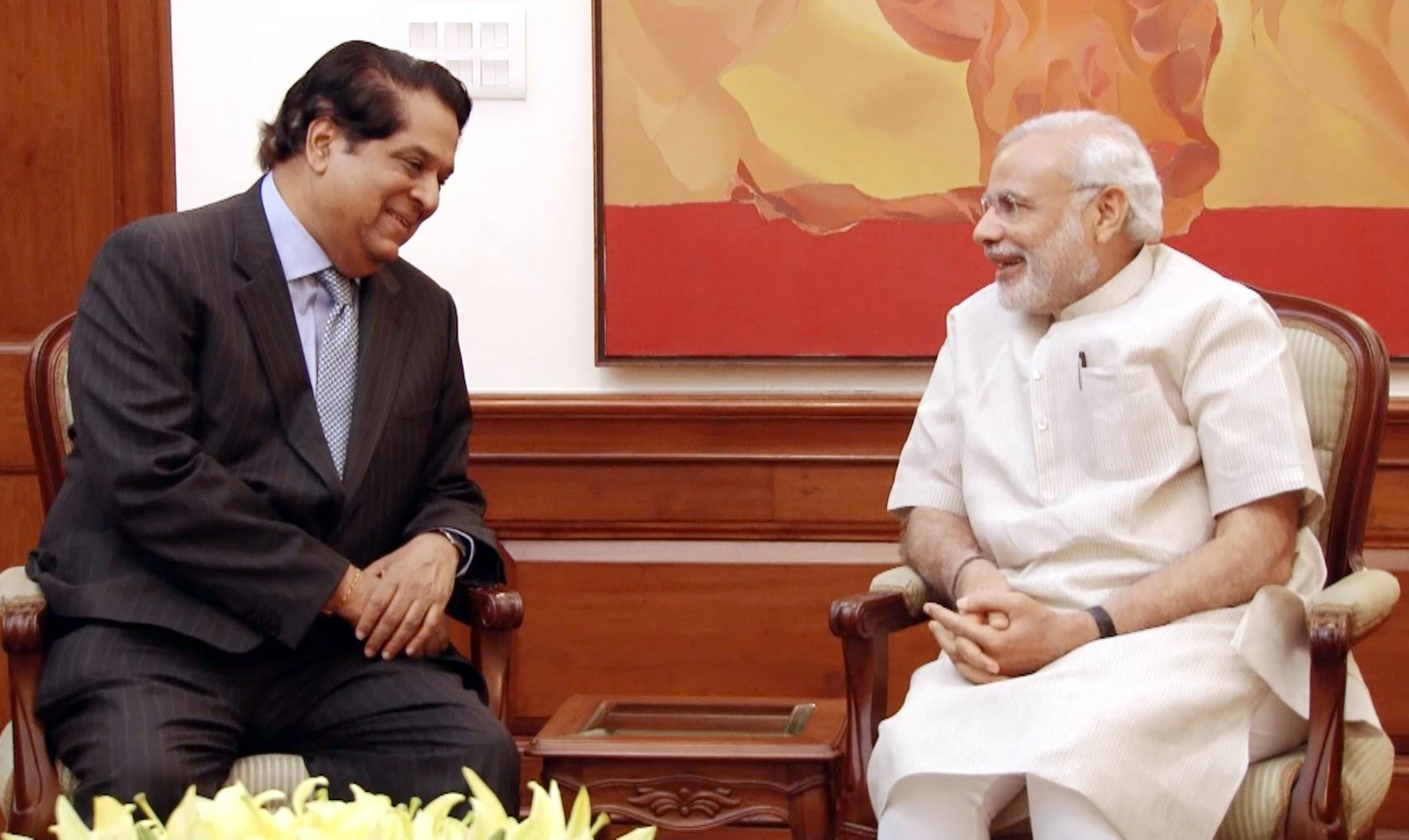
The president of the New Development Bank K.V. Kamath with the Indian prime minister Narendra Modi in May 2015

On 11 May 2015, K. V. Kamath was appointed as the first president of the bank. According to the bank, the policies and procedures for all functional areas were approved at the board of directors meeting in January 2016. On 27 February 2016, the NDB signed an agreement with the Government of China and local government of Shanghai to establish the headquarters of the bank in Shanghai. On 19 July 2016, the NDB reported that it successfully issued the bank's first green financial bond with issue size of RMB 3 billion, with a tenure of five years in the China interbank bond market.

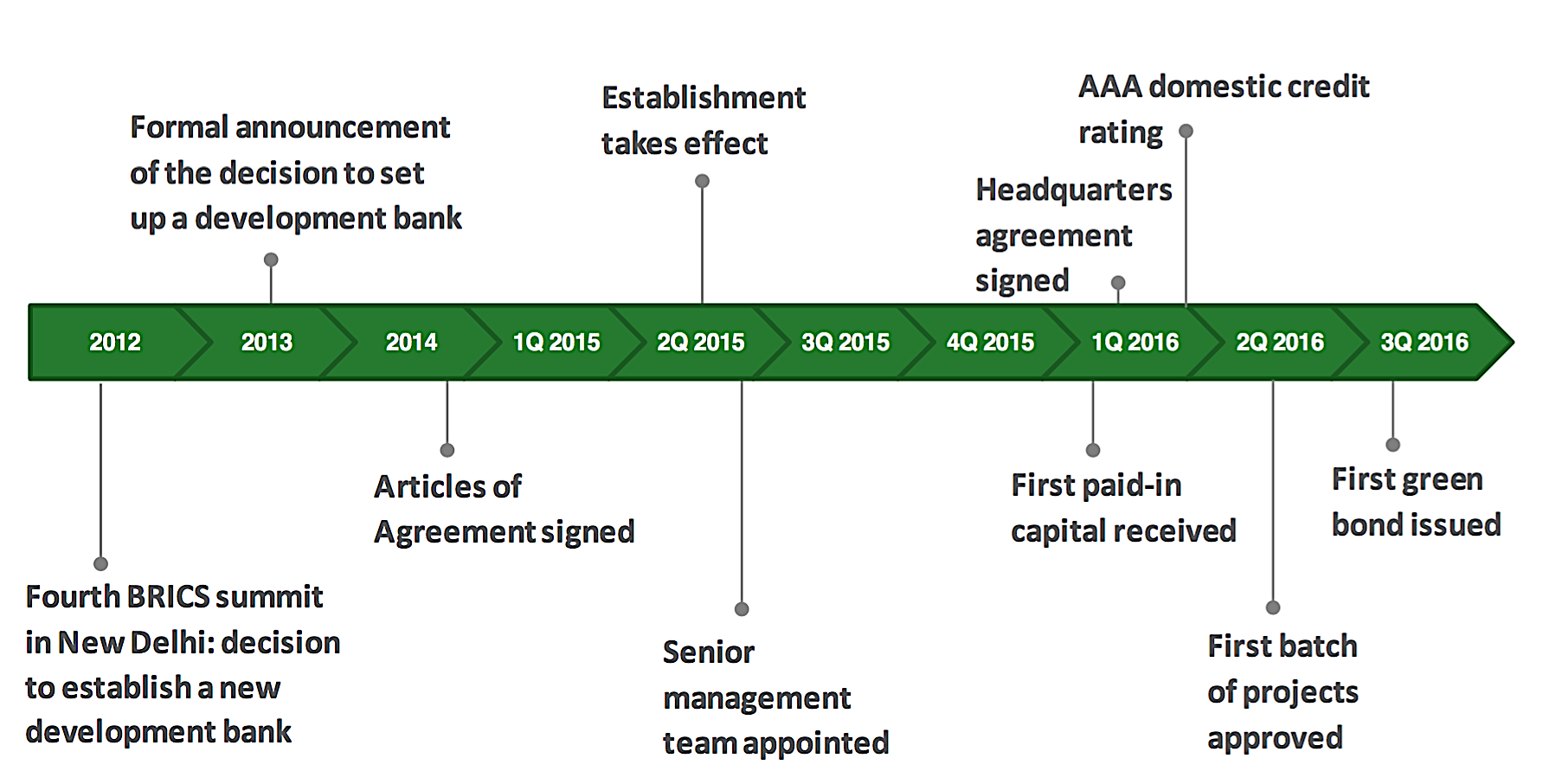
NDB Creation Milestones

On 20 July 2016, the first annual meeting of the NDB board of governors was held in Shanghai. The participants of the meeting discussed the bank's future work and development and gave a positive assessment to the bank's work. At the meeting, the first green financial bond issuance in renminbi was highlighted as a milestone event for the NDB. In 2016, the NDB board of directors approved the first set of projects in all members of the bank. On 21 December 2016, the NDB signed its first loan agreement. The NDB received AA+ credit ratings from S&P Global Ratings (S&P) and Fitch Ratings (Fitch) in August 2018, which enables the bank to offer full suite of financial products to its public and private sector clients. In April 2020, the New Development Bank established an Emergency Assistance Facility that sought to finance costs related to the fight against the Coronavirus and soften the blow from the economic impact. In addition to committing US$5 billion to this cause, the NDB targeted to provide up to 10 billion dollars.

In March 2022, the NDB announced that "sound banking principles" required that all new transactions with Russia be put on hold. Even though the NDB quickly cut ties with Russia, Fitch Ratings still downgraded the NDB from stable to negative on its Long-Term Issuer Default scale. In May 2022, the New Development Bank set up a regional office in India in the state of Gujarat with the goal of financing and observing infrastructure projects in both India and Bangladesh. In May 2023, Saudi Arabia expressed its intention to join the NDB.

== Structure and objectives ==
=== Corporate governance ===
According to the Articles of Agreement, the main organs of the bank are:

- Board of governors
- Board of directors
- President and vice-presidents

Information about the composition of the NDB board of governors is available on the bank's official website.

The NDB president is elected on a rotational basis from one of the founding members, and there are four vice presidents from each of the other four founding members.

K. V. Kamath, from India, is the first elected president of the NDB. He was replaced as president by Marcos Prado Troyjo from Brazil since 7 July 2020. Marcos Troyjo was elected president of the New Development Bank on 27 May 2020. Following Luiz Inácio Lula da Silva election, the Brazilian government solicited his renouncement, after then he was replaced by Dilma Rousseff by 24 March 2023.

=== Capital ===
The New Development Bank has an initial subscribed capital of US$50 billion and an initial authorized capital of US$100 billion. The initial subscribed capital is equally distributed among the founding members. The payment of the amount initially subscribed by each founding member to the paid-in capital stock of the bank will be made in dollars in 7 installments. Each member cannot increase its share of capital without all other four members agreeing. The bank will allow new members to join but the BRICS capital share cannot fall below 55%.

=== Objectives ===
The bank aims to contribute to the development plans established nationally through projects that are socially, environmentally and economically sustainable. Taking this into account, the main objectives of the NDB can be summarized as follows

1. Promote infrastructure and sustainable development projects with a significant development impact in member countries.
2. Establish an extensive network of global partnerships with other multilateral development institutions and national development banks.
3. Build a balanced project portfolio giving a proper respect to their geographic location, financing requirements and other factors.

== Membership ==
NDB Member Countries
Founding Member Countries	Date of Accession
Brazil	July 3, 2015
Russia	July 3, 2015
India	July 3, 2015
China	July 3, 2015
South Africa	July 3, 2015
New Members	
Bangladesh	September 16, 2021
United Arab Emirates	October 4, 2021
Egypt	February 20, 2023
Algeria	May 19, 2025
Uzbekistan	June 5, 2026
Prospective Members	
Uruguay	
Colombia	
Ethiopia	
Angola	
Zimbabwe	
Belarus	
Indonesia	

The Agreement on the New Development Bank entered into force in July 2015, with the official declaration of all five states that have signed it. The five founding members of the Bank include Brazil, Russia, India, China and South Africa.

The NDB's Articles of Agreement specify that all members of the United Nations could be members of the bank, however the share of the original BRICS group can never be less than 55% of total voting power. The current voting power of the original five members is more than 90%.

In 2016, some experts considered that expanding the NDB's membership to be crucial to its long-term development by helping boost the bank's business growth.

According to the Bank's General Strategy: 2017–2021, the NDB plans to expand membership gradually so as not to overly strain its operational and decision-making capacity.

In September 2021, Bangladesh, the United Arab Emirates and Uruguay joined the NDB.

In December 2021, the NDB admitted Egypt as a new member. Algeria formally presented a request to join after the Algerian president visit to China in 2023, and was officially admitted as a member of the BRICS New Development Bank (NDB) in September 2024.

Potential or prospective members include Honduras and Serbia.

== Shareholding structure ==
According to Articles of Agreement of the New Development Bank, the initial authorized capital of the bank is divided into 1 million shares, having a par value of $100,000. Each founding member of the bank has initially subscribed 100,000 shares, in a total of $10 billion, of which 20,000 shares correspond to paid-in capital, in a total of $2 billion and 80,000 shares correspond to callable capital, in a total of $8 billion.

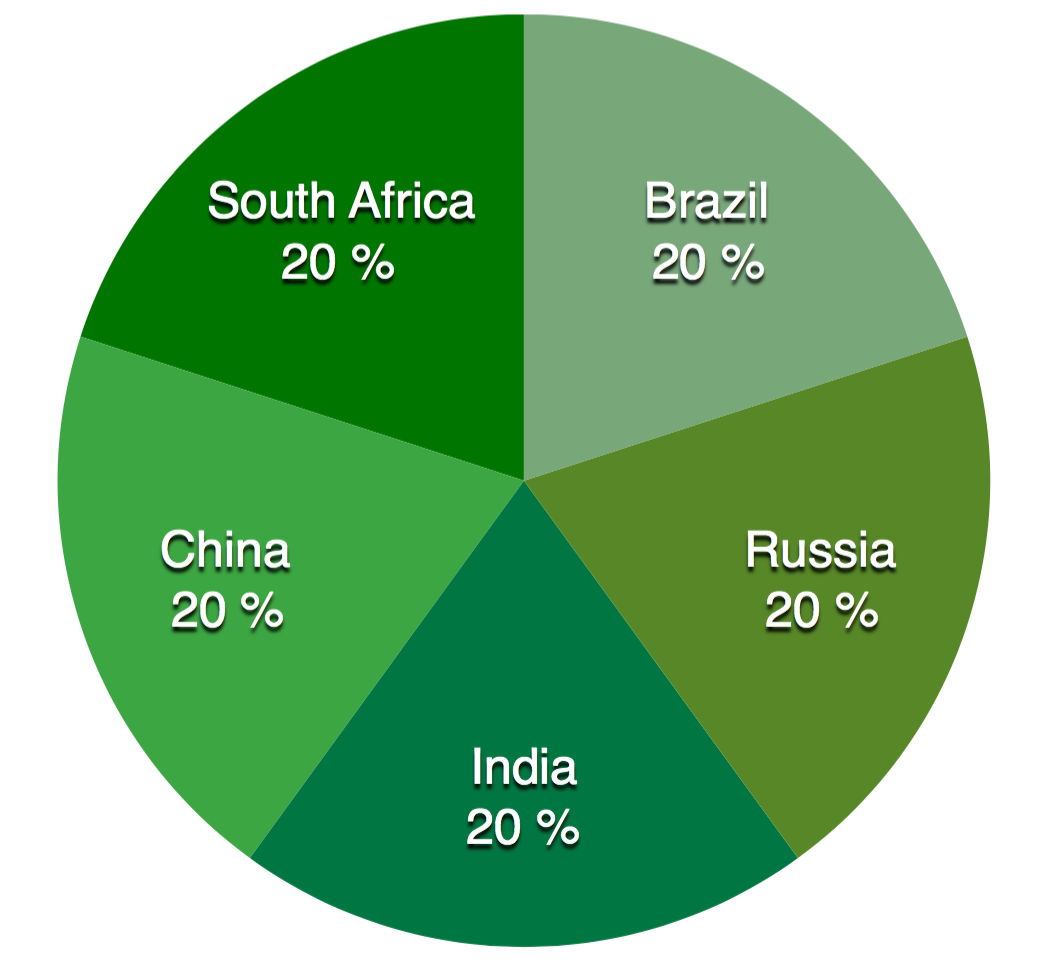
Equal distribution of shares between the founding shareholders of the NDB

The current distribution of shares between NDB member countries is presented in the following table.

Countries by Shareholding at the New Development Bank
Country	SHARES (NUMBER) Shares subscribed	SHARES (NUMBER) Exercisable votes	SUBSCRIBED CAPITAL Amount (billion USD)	SUBSCRIBED CAPITAL % of total
Brazil	100,000	100,000	10.000	18.72
Russia	100,000	100,000	10.000	18.72
India	100,000	100,000	10.000	18.72
China	100,000	100,000	10.000	18.72
South Africa	100,000	100,000	10.000	18.72
Algeria	6,140	6,140	0.614	1.15
Bangladesh	9,420	9,420	0.942	1.76
Egypt	11,960	11,960	1.196	2.24
United Arab Emirates	5,560	5,560	0.556	1.04
Uzbekistan	1,215	1,215	0.122	0.23
Uruguay				
Colombia				
Ethiopia				
Angola				
Zimbabwe				
Belarus				
Indonesia				
Unallocated Shares	465,705	465,705	46.571	
Grand Total	1,000,000	1,000,000	100.000	100.00%

== Activities ==
=== Projects ===
According to the Bank's General Strategy, sustainable infrastructure development is at the core of NDB's operational strategy in 2017–2021, and the Bank will dedicate about two-thirds of financing commitments in its first five years to this area.

The New Development Bank is planning to give a priority to projects aimed at developing renewable energy sources. As it was stated by the bank, it wants to cooperate with other institutions in accelerating ‘green’ financing expansion and promoting environment protection.

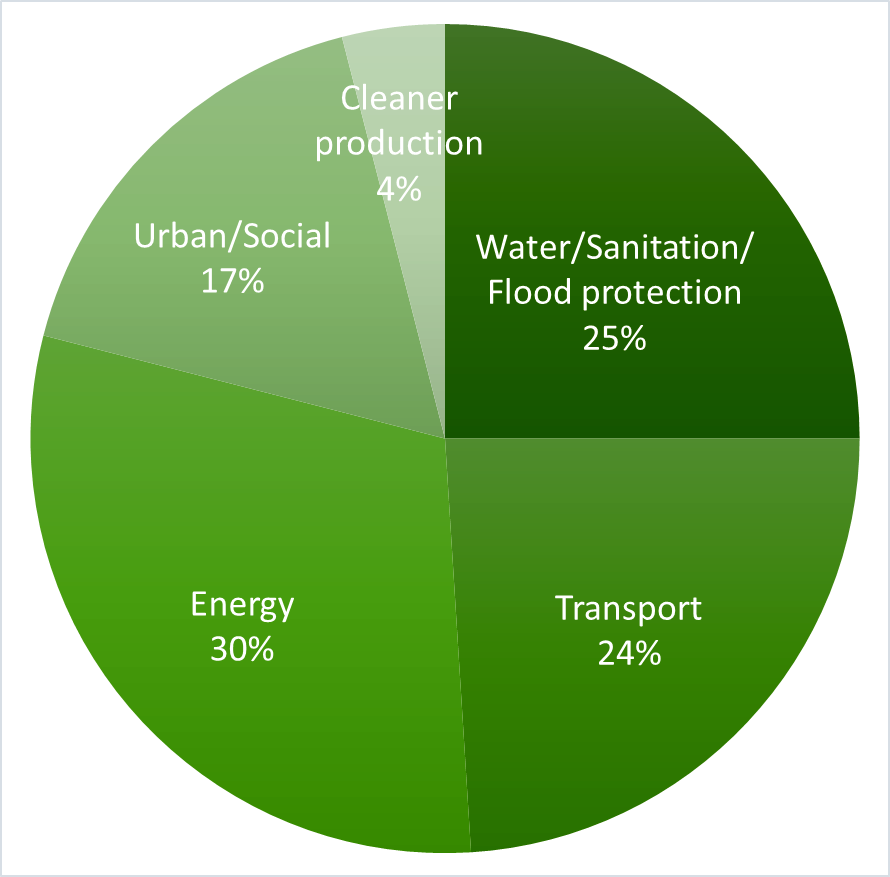
Breakdown of NDB's loan approvals by sector (as of 1 August 2018)

The NDB has expressed interest in funding projects that conform to high environmental standards, including those in the field of infrastructure, such as energy, railways and highways in the future. At the same time, according to K. V. Kamath, the NDB President, one of the key strategies of the bank will be financing profitable projects (bankable) with return on capital. The NDB wants "to fund projects that are creative and bring benefits to the local people and environment", said Vice President Zhu Xian.

"The leadership of the member countries task the bank with developing a strong pipeline of projects and responding in a fast and flexible manner to aspirations and interests of its members".

As of 6 March 2019, the NDB Board of Directors approved 30 projects with loans aggregating over approx. USD 8 billion.

The bank has begun non-sovereign operations with loans approved in Brazil, South Africa, and Russia. In May 2024, BRICS Development Bank announces to allocate US$1.115 bi to Rio Grande do Sul for rebuilding the urban and rural infrastructure after the 2024 floods.

=== Bonds ===
In March 2016, the NDB announced that it will do a bond issue in China to raise funding domestically on the Chinese market. The bond issue is likely to happen in the second quarter of the year 2016, said the NDB Vice President Leslie Maasdorp. He added the bank is starting to finalize the exact size of this bond issue.

On 18 July 2016 the NDB successfully issued its first green financial bond with issue size of RMB 3 billion, tenor of 5 years in China onshore interbank bond market. The bond's nominal interest rate is 3.07%. The bank became the first international financial institution that issued a green financial bond in the China onshore bond market. The proceeds of the bond will be used for infrastructure and sustainable development projects in the member countries.

In February 2019, the bank successfully placed CNY 3 billion RMB-denominated bond in the China Interbank Bond Market, and it was priced at the lower end of announced pricing range.

On May 18, 2022, the New Development Bank issued a 7 billion RMB - 3 year bond into the Chinese Interbank Bond Market (CIMB), making it the largest bond ever made by foreign issuers. It received an Issuer Rating(IR) of AA+ from both S&P and Fitch.

== Relations with other institutions ==
=== Approach ===
The Articles of Agreement of the bank say that the NDB was established to complement the existing efforts of multilateral and regional financial institutions for global growth and development. Moreover, the NDB is authorized by its founders to cooperate within its mandate with other international organizations, as well as national entities (public or private), in particular with international financial institutions and national development banks.

The NDB President K.V.Kamath stresses that the bank regards other international financial institutions, including IMF and World Bank as partners, not rivals.

=== Asian Development Bank ===
In July 2016, the NDB signed with Asian Development Bank (ADB) a memorandum of understanding on strategic cooperation. The two institutions expressed willingness to work together through co-financing and knowledge exchanges in areas including sustainable development projects in renewable energy, energy efficiency, clean transportation, sustainable water management, and sewage treatment.

=== Asian Infrastructure Investment Bank ===
According to a representative of the Bank's management, the NDB and AIIB are sister institutions in many respects. These two banks have complementary mandates and different geographic focuses, with the NDB being more focused on BRICS countries. At the same time, there is a certain overlapping between mandates of the NDB and the AIIB, as both of them are aimed at developing infrastructure and pay a special attention to sustainable development. However, due to the fact that current financing and investment patterns are inadequate in meeting investment needs, there is "space for newcomers", he said.

In February 2016, the president of the NDB dismissed concerns over overlapping of interests of China-backed AIIB and the NDB.

=== World Bank ===
According to media reports, other multilateral development institutions, including the World Bank Group (WBG), have expressed an intention to work together with the NDB. In September 2016, NDB and World Bank Group signed a memorandum of understanding on cooperation and it was announced that the NDB and WBG's cooperative efforts will focus primarily on infrastructure.

== Partnerships and cooperation agreements ==
=== Multilateral development banks ===
- World Bank
- Inter-American Development Bank (IDB)
- Financial Fund for the Development of the River Plate Basin (FONPLATA)
- European Bank for Reconstruction and Development (EBRD)
- Asian Infrastructure Investment Bank (AIIB)
- Caribbean Development Bank (CDB)
- Eurasian Development Bank (EDB)
- International Investment Bank (IIB)
- Development Bank of Latin America and the Caribbean (CAF)
- Asian Development Bank (ADB)
- Islamic Development Bank (IsDB)
- European Investment Bank (EIB)

=== National development banks ===
- Development Bank of Southern Africa (DBSA)
- Agricultural Development Bank of China (ADBC)
- Exim Bank of China
- China Development Bank (CDB)
- Brazilian National Bank for Economic and Social Development (BNDES)

== Reception ==
The logo of the NDB in the bank's HQ in Shanghai

=== Prominent scholars ===
In July 2014, Nobel Prize winning economist Joseph Stiglitz said the NDB marks a "fundamental change in global economic and political power." In his opinion, "The existing institutions just don't have enough resources."

In the analysis of academic Suisheng Zhao, China's role in the creation of the NBD is "a symbolic gesture to create a sort of IMF clone writ small toward reshaping the Western-dominated international financial architecture."

=== Officials ===
Chinese Premier Li Keqiang called the opening of the NDB an "important step forward" in cooperation among BRICS countries. "This is great progress in financial cooperation among developing countries and emerging economies, as well as a helpful supplement to the global financial system," Li Keqiang said at a meeting with K. V. Kamath in Beijing in July, 2015.

China Finance Minister Lou Jiwei said that the establishment of the NDB and the Beijing-led AIIB would encourage existing multilateral institutions to do better. At a news conference at the conclusion of the G20 meeting of finance ministers and central bank governors in Shanghai he added that the New Development Bank could help drive aggregate global demand.

=== Bankers ===
8 July 2015, VTB CEO Andrey Kostin said that the NDB is "important because it's a first institution created by the BRICS countries." "Actually we are talking about the institutionalization of the BRICS process, and that's quite important I think. It's a permanent working instrument which will be working every day and which will be in the heart of BRICS cooperation," he added.

According to former Reserve Bank of India governor Raghuram Rajan, the NDB "Is a co-operative effort between all BRICS countries." "We have already reached contingency reserve agreement (CRA). This is second. Let's see how it develops. Lots of hopes embedded in it for greater cooperation (among the) BRICS countries," he told reporters in February 2016.

== Logo and identity ==
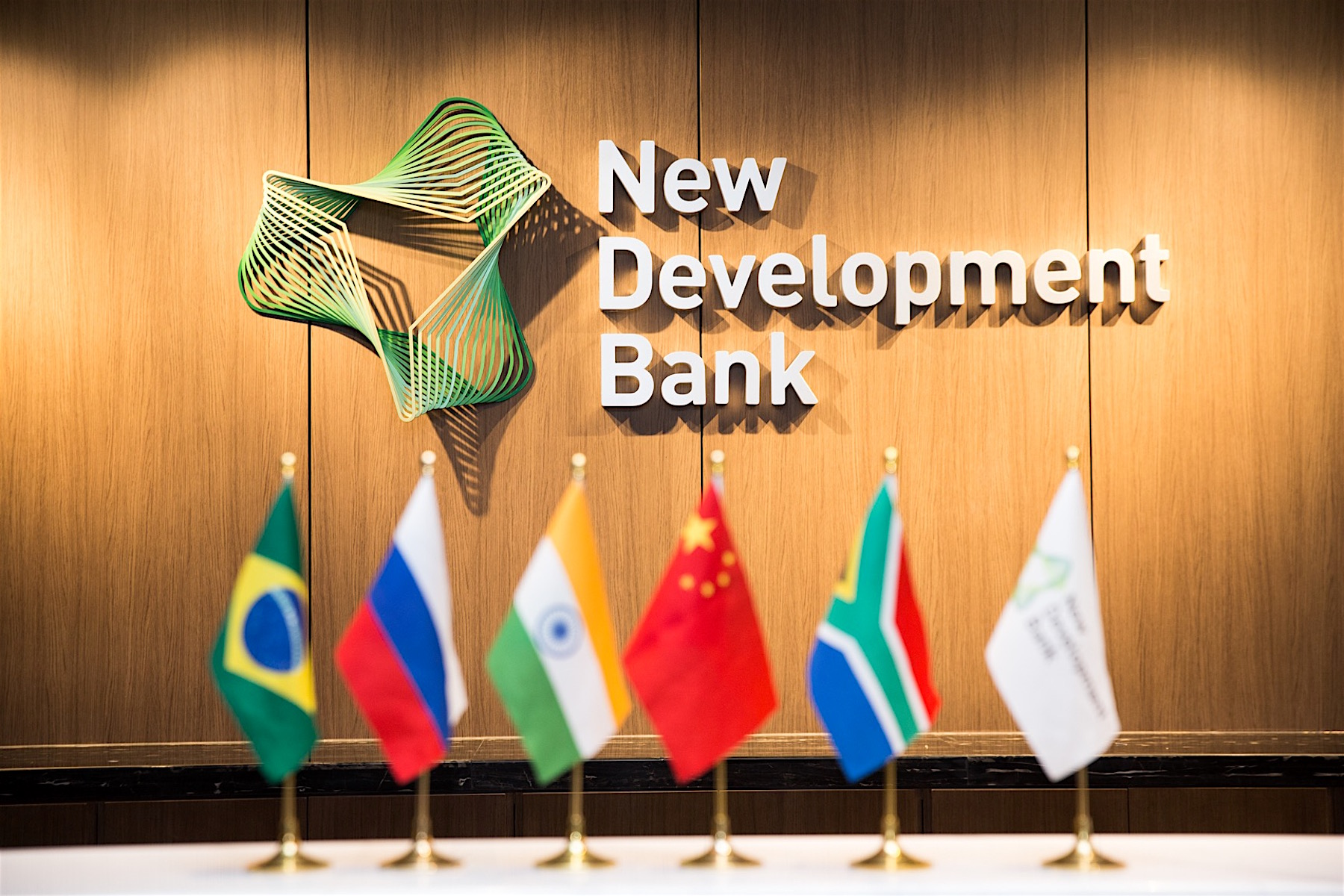
The logo of the NDB in the bank's HQ in Shanghai

The logo of the New Development Bank borrows from the mathematical concept of a Mobius strip that symbolizes the idea of continuous transformation. Its nature is not to disrupt but drive change in the existing system from within.

The logo consists of a triangle in motion at one end signifying balanced evolution. The other end, moving in the opposite direction, is a propeller that represents speed and dynamism. These two entities are held together by a wireframe, the skeletal basic of infrastructure. The logo is rendered in gradient of green that symbolizes sustainability. This constant motion symbolizes the values that the bank strives to live by – agility, innovation and continuous transformation.

== List of New Development Bank presidents ==
#	Portrait	Name	Term	Term of office	Nationality	Background	Notes
1		K. V. Kamath	11 May 2015 – 27 May 2020	5 years, 16 days	India	MBA at Indian Institute of Management, Ahmedabad; former chairman of Infosys Limited; former non-executive chairman of ICICI Bank	First New Development Bank president
2		Marcos Prado Troyjo	27 May 2020 – 24 March 2023	2 years, 301 days	Brazil	Diplomat, economist and sociologist; Founder and Director of BRICLab at Columbia University; former Deputy Economy Minister for Foreign Trade & International Affairs of Brazil	First Brazilian to lead a multilateral development institution
3		Dilma Rousseff	24 March 2023 – present	3 years, 230 days	Brazil	Economist at Federal University of Rio Grande do Sul; former President of Brazil; former Chief of Staff of the Presidency in Brazil; former Minister of Mines and Energy in Brazil.	First woman to lead New Development Bank

== See also ==
- BRICS Contingent Reserve Arrangement
- Asian Infrastructure Investment Bank
- Policy bank
