= List of international presidential trips made by Asif Ali Zardari =

This is a list of international presidential trips made by Asif Ali Zardari, the 11th President of Pakistan.

== First term ==
President: 9 September 2008 - 9 September 2013

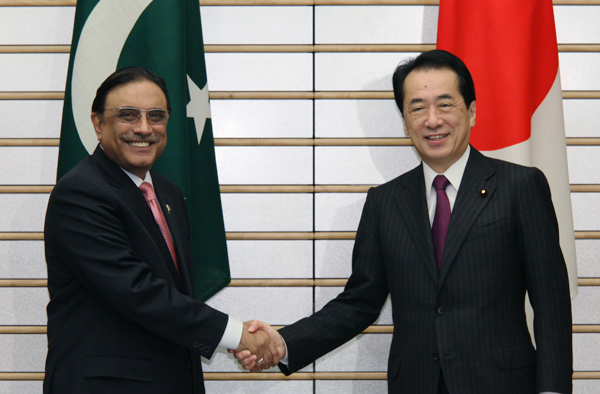
President of Pakistan Asif Ali Zardari meeting with Prime Minister of Japan Naoto Kan in Tokyo, 22 February 2011.

=== 2008 ===
Country	Date/s	Engagements	Ref.
UK	14-16 September	Met with British PM Gordon Brown.	
United Nations	23 September	Attended "UNGA session" and met President Bush.	
China	14–17 October	Met with Chinese President Hu Jintao.	
Saudi Arabia	4–5 November	Met with King Abdullah.	
United States	12-14 November	Attended "UNGA Session on Culture and Peace".	
UAE	24–25 November	Met with President Khalifa bin Zayed Al Nahyan.	
Turkey	4–6 December	Attended "2nd Afghan-Pak-Turk Trilateral Summit".	

=== 2009 ===
Country	Date/s	Engagements	Ref.
Afghanistan	6-7 January	Held meeting with President Hamid Karzai.	
China	20-23 February	Met with State Councilor of China Dai Bingguo.	
Iran	10-11 March	Attended 10th ECO Summit. Met with President Mahmoud Ahmadinejad.	
Turkey	31 March -1 April	Attended "3rd Afghan-Pak-Turk Trilateral Summit".	
Japan	15–17 April	Attended Friends of Democratic Pakistan conference. Met Emperor Akihito and PM Tarō Asō.	
China	17-19 April	Attended "Boao Forum for Asia".	
Libya	30 April - 2 May	Met with Leader of Libya Muammar Gaddafi.	
United States	5–8 May	Held trilateral meeting with Presidents of USA and Afghanistan.	
UK	13-14 May	Met with PM Gordon Brown.	
France	15–18 May	Met with French President Nicolas Sarkozy. Signed France–Pakistan Nuclear Deal	
Iran	24 May	Attended "Afghanistan-Iran-Pakistan Trilateral Summit".	
Russia	15-16 June	Attended "9th SCO Head of State Summit". Met with Presidents of Afghanistan and Russia (trilaterally) and PM of India.	
Belgium	16–19 June	Attended "1st Pak-EU Summit". Addressed North Atlantic Council.	
Tajikistan	28–30 July	Attended "1st Afghan-Pak-Rus-Tajik Quadrilateral Summit".	
China	21-25 August	Visited China's two Economic Development Models Zhejiang and Guangdong. Met with FM Yang Jiechi.	
UK	26-28 August	Discussed shared threat of terrorism with PM Brown. Met with MQM leader Altaf Hussain.	
United Nations	24–25 September	Attended "UNGA Session" and "FDP Summit".	
Italy	28–30 September	Met with PM of Italy Silvio Berlusconi and Pope Benedict XVI.	

=== 2010 ===
Country	Date/s	Engagements	Ref.
Syria	8-9 January	Met with President Bashar al-Assad.	
Turkey	24-26 January	Attended "4th Afghan-Pak-Turk Trilateral Summit" and "Istanbul Summit on Friendship and Cooperation in the Heart of Asia".	
Uzbekistan	10–11 June	Attended "10th SCO Head of State Summit". Met with Russian President Dmitry Medvedev.	
China	6–11 July	Met with President Hu Jintao, Premier Wen Jiabao. Visited pavilions at Expo 2010.	
France	1–3 August	Held 45 minutes meeting with French President, talked about Pakistan's role against terrorism.	
UK	3-8 August	Considered as a controversial visit. Met with PM David Cameron.	
Syria	9 August	Stopover. Met with President Bashar al-Assad.	
Russia	18 August	Attended "2nd Afghan-Pak-Rus-Tajik Quadrilateral Summit".	
China	11-13 November	Met with Premier of China. Attended the "Opening Ceremony of 16th Asian Games".	
Sri Lanka	27–30 November	Met with President Mahinda Rajapaksa.	
Turkey	22-24 December	Attended "11th ECO Summit" and "5th Afghan-Pak-Turk Trilateral Summit".	

=== 2011 ===
Country	Date/s	Engagements	Ref.
United States	14 January	Met with President Obama. Attended the Memorial Service of Richard Holbrooke.	
UAE	17-18 January	Attended "4th World Future Energy Summit". Met with UN Secretary-General and PM of UAE.	
Japan	21–23 February	Met with Prime Minister Naoto Kan.	
Turkey	11–14 April	Held meeting with President and Prime Minister of Turkey.	
Kuwait	7–8 May	Met with Emir of Kuwait Sabah Al-Ahmad.	
Russia	11–13 May	Held meeting with President Dmitry Medvedev.	
Kazakhstan	14-15 June	Attended "11th SCO Head of State Summit".	
Iran	25-26 June	Attended "Global Fight Against Terrorism Summit". Met with Ayatollah Khamenei.	
Iran	16 July	Met with Supreme Leader and President of Iran.	
Saudi Arabia	20–21 July	Met with King Abdullah.	
Bahrain	17 August	Met with King Hamad bin Isa.	
China	30 August - 1 September	Participated in 1st China-Eurasia Expo. Met with Vice Premier of China.	
Tajikistan	1–2 September	Attended "3rd Afghan-Pak-Rus-Tajik Quadrilateral Summit".	
Jordan	21-23 October	Attended "WEF meeting on Economic Growth and Job Creation in Arab World". Met with Abdullah II.	
Saudi Arabia	25 October	Attended the funeral of Sultan bin Abdulaziz. Met with Nayef bin Abdulaziz to condole his death.	
Turkey	31 October - 1 November	Attended "6th Afghan-Pak-Turk Trilateral Summit".	

=== 2012 ===
Country	Date/s	Engagements	Ref.
Myanmar	24–25 January	Met with President Thein Sein and Suu Kyi.	
Tajikistan	24–26 March	Attended " Afghan-Iran-Pak-Turk Quadrilateral Summit", "RECCA V Summit" and "Nawroz Festival".	
India	8 April	Met with PM Manmohan Singh. Visited Shrine of Mu'in al-Din Chishti in Ajmer.	
United States	19–21 May	Attended "2012 Chicago NATO Summit". Met with President Obama, Karzai and US SecState, Hillary Clinton.	
China	5–7 June	Attended "2012 Beijing SCO Summit". Met with President of China.	
UK	27-30 June	Attended "Graduation ceremony of Bakhtawar Bhutto". Met with First Secretary of State William Hague, also met Altaf Hussain.	
Saudi Arabia	13-15 August	Attended "4th Extraordinary OIC Summit".	
Iran	29–31 August	Attended "16th NAM Summit". Met with Iran's Supreme Leader and PM of India.	
United Nations	24–25 September	Attended "UNGA Session". Met with Hillary Clinton.	
Azerbaijan	15–16 October	Attended "12th ECO Summit". Met with President of Azerbaijan.	
Qatar	6–7 November	Met with Emir of Qatar.	
South Korea	3–5 December	Met with President Lee Myung-bak.	
France	9–11 December	President Zardari and DG UNESCO hosted the event "Stand up for Malala – Stand up for girls' right to education". Zardari also met President of France.	
Turkey	11-13 December	Attended "7th Afghan-Pak-Turk Trilateral Summit".	

=== 2013 ===
Country	Date/s	Engagements	Ref.
Iran	27–28 February	Met with Supreme Leader and President of Iran. Negotiated about IP Gas project.	
Iran	11 March	Inaugurated the construction of IP Gas project with President Mahmoud Ahmadinejad.	
Iran	3-4 August	Attended "First inauguration of Hassan Rouhani" and met him.	

== Second term ==
President: 10 March 2024 – present

=== 2024 ===
Country	Date/s	Engagements	Ref.
Turkmenistan	10–11 October	Attended "Interrelation of Times and Civilization - Basis of Peace and Development" Forum Dedicated to 300th anniversary of Magtymguly Pyragy. Met President Berdimuhamedow, also met Putin (informally).	

=== 2025 ===
Country	Date/s	Engagements	Ref.
China	4-8 February	Asif Ali Zardari met with President Xi Jinping. Attended the "Opening Ceremony of 9th Asian Winter Games".	
Turkey	10 February	Stopover. Met with President Erdoğan.	
Portugal	10-11 February	Met with Aga Khan V, condoles over death of Aga Khan IV. Also met President of Portugal.	
China	12-21 September	Met with Party Secretary of Xinjiang, Chen Xiaojiang. Also visited Chengdu, Shanghai, Ürümqi and Kashgar.	
Qatar	3-6 November	Attended Second World Summit for Social Development. Met with Emir of Qatar and President of Iraq.	
Iraq	20-24 December	Met with President Abdul Latif Rashid and PM Mohammed Shia' al-Sudani. Visited Imam Ali Shrine.	

=== 2026 ===
Country	Date/s	Engagements	Ref.
UAE	26-29 January	Met with President MBZ and Vice President MBR.	
Kyrgyzstan	6-9 July	Met with President Sadyr Japarov	
China	April 25 - May 1	Official trip on the invitation of Chinese President Xi Jinping.	
Austria	27-31 August		
