= List of international trips made by presidents of Iran =

This is a list of international trips made by presidents of Iran.

== President Masoud Pezeshkian ==
Map of international trips made by Masoud Pezeshkian as president

List of Trips
#	Start	End	Country	Cities	Description
1	September 11, 2024	September 13, 2024	Iraq (Kurdistan Region) Iraqi Kurdistan	Baghdad, Erbil, Sulaymaniyah, Najaf, Karbala, Basra	President Pezeshkian had meetings with Iraqi Prime minister, Iraqi President and Iraqi Kurdistan officials
2	September 22, 2024	September 26, 2024	United Nations	New York City	President Pezeshkian participated in 79th United Nations General Assembly
3	October 2, 2024	October 3, 2024	Qatar	Doha	President Pezeshkian participated in Asian Cooperation Dialogue and had an official meeting with Qatari Emir
4	October 10, 2024	October 11, 2024	Turkmenistan	Ashgabat	President Pezeshkian visited Turkmenistan to participate in a cultural summit by invitation of president and national leader of Turkmenistan
5	October 22, 2024	October 24, 2024	Russia	Kazan	President Pezeshkian participated in 2024 BRICS Summit
6	December 18, 2024	December 20, 2024	Egypt	Cairo	President Pezeshkian participated in Developing 8 Countries summit in 2024 by invitation of Egyptian President Abdel Fattah El-Sisi
7	January 15, 2025	January 17, 2025	Tajikistan	Dushanbe	President Pezeshkian visited Tajikistan by invitation of president of Tajikistan Emomali Rahmon
8	January 17, 2025	January 18, 2025	Russia	Moscow	President Pezeshkian visited Russia by invitation of president of Russia Vladimir Putin
9	April 28, 2025	April 28, 2025	Azerbaijan	Baku	President Pezeshkian visited Azerbaijan by invitation of president of Azerbaijan Ilham Aliyev
10	May 27, 2025	May 28, 2025	Oman	Muscat	President Pezeshkian visited Oman by invitation of Sultan of Oman Haitham bin Tariq
11	July 4, 2025	July 4, 2025	Azerbaijan	Khankendi	President Pezeshkian participated in 2025 ECO Summit in Azerbaijan
12	August 2, 2025	August 3, 2025	Pakistan	Lahore, Islamabad	President Pezeshkian visited Pakistan by invitation of Prime minister of Pakistan Shehbaz Sharif
13	August 18, 2025	August 19, 2025	Armenia	Yerevan	President Pezeshkian visited Armenia by invitation of Prime minister of Armenia Nikol Pashinyan and President Vahagn Khachaturian
14	August 19, 2025	August 20, 2025	Belarus	Minsk	President Pezeshkian visited Belarus by invitation of President of Belarus Alexander Lukashenko
15	August 31, 2025	September 3, 2025	China	Tianjin, Beijing	President Pezeshkian participated in 25th SCO Summit and an 80th victory parade in Tiananmen square
16	September 15, 2025	September 15, 2025	Qatar	Doha	President Pezeshkian participated in Extraordinary 2025 Arab–Islamic extraordinary summit
17	September 23, 2025	September 27, 2025	United Nations	New York City	Participation in 80th United Nations General Assembly
18	December 10, 2025	December 11, 2025	Kazakhstan	Astana	President Pezeshkian visited Kazakhstan by invitation of President Kassym-Jomart Tokayev
19	December 11, 2025	December 12, 2025	Turkmenistan	Ashgabat	President Pezeshkian participated in peace and trust international conference in Ashgabat
20	June 23, 2026	June 23, 2026	Pakistan	Islamabad	President Pezeshkian met with president Asif Ali Zardari, prime minister Shehbaz Sharif and chief of army staff Asim Munir
21	July 7, 2026	July 8, 2026	Iraq	Najaf	
22	August 31, 2026	September 1, 2026	Kyrgyzstan	Bishkek	President Pezeshkian participated in 2026 SCO Summit
23	September 11, 2026	September 13, 2026	India	New Delhi	President Pezeshkian participated in 2026 BRICS Summit
24	September 22, 2026	September 25, 2026	United Nations	New York City	Participation in 81st United Nations General Assembly
25	October 8, 2026	October 9, 2026	Turkmenistan	Awaza National Tourist Zone	President Pezeshkian participated in 2026 CIS Summit
26	October 16, 2026	October 16, 2026	Armenia	Yerevan	President Pezeshkian participated in CBD COP17
27	October 26, 2026	October 27, 2026	Russia	Moscow	President Pezeshkian participated in GECF summit
28	November 10, 2026	November 11, 2026	Turkey	Antalya	President Pezeshkian participated in COP31 summit

== President Ebrahim Raisi ==
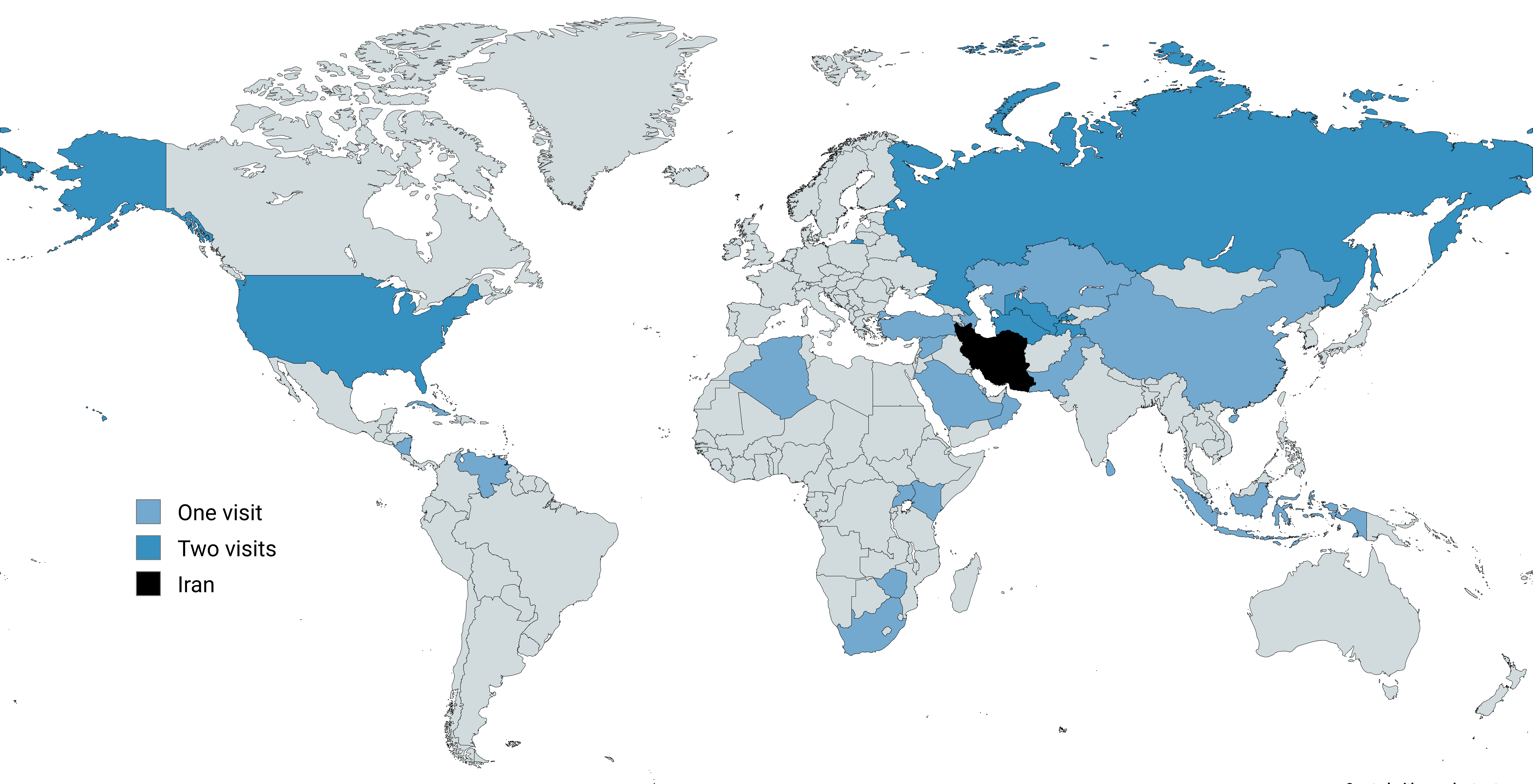
Map of international trips made by Ebrahim Raisi as president

List of Trips
#	Start	End	Country	Cities
1	September 16, 2021	September 18, 2021	Tajikistan	Dushanbe and Kulob
2	November 27, 2021	November 28, 2021	Turkmenistan	Ashgabat
3	January 19, 2022	January 20, 2022	Russia	Moscow
4	February 21, 2022	February 22, 2022	Qatar	Doha
5	May 23, 2022	May 24, 2022	Oman	Muscat
6	June 29, 2022	June 30, 2022	Turkmenistan	Ashghabad
7	September 14, 2022	September 16, 2022	Uzbekistan	Samarkand
8	September 18, 2022	September 22, 2022	United Nations	New York City
9	October 11, 2022	October 12, 2022	Kazakhstan	Astana
10	February 13, 2023	February 15, 2023	China	Beijing
11	May 3, 2023	May 5, 2023	Syria	Damascus
12	May 23, 2023	May 24, 2023	Indonesia	Jakarta and Bogor
13	June 12, 2023	June 14, 2023	Venezuela	Caracas
14	June 14, 2023	June 15, 2023	Nicaragua	Managua
15	June 15, 2023	June 16, 2023	Cuba	Havana
16	July 12, 2023	July 12, 2023	Kenya	Nairobi
17	July 12, 2023	July 13, 2023	Uganda	Kampala
18	July 13, 2023	July 13, 2023	Zimbabwe	Harare
19	August 22, 2023	August 24, 2023	South Africa	Johannesburg
20	September 18, 2023	September 21, 2023	United Nations	New York City
21	November 8, 2023	November 8, 2023	Tajikistan	Dushanbe
22	November 9, 2023	November 9, 2023	Uzbekistan	Tashkent
23	November 11, 2023	November 11, 2023	Saudi Arabia	Riyadh
24	December 7, 2023	December 7, 2023	Russia	Moscow
25	January 24, 2024	January 24, 2024	Turkey	Ankara
26	March 2, 2024	March 3, 2024	Algeria	Algiers
27	April 22, 2024	April 24, 2024	Pakistan	Islamabad, Lahore and Karachi
28	April 24, 2024	April 26, 2024	Sri Lanka	Colombo
29	May 17, 2024	May 19, 2024	Azerbaijan	Qiz Qalasi dam

== President Hassan Rouhani ==
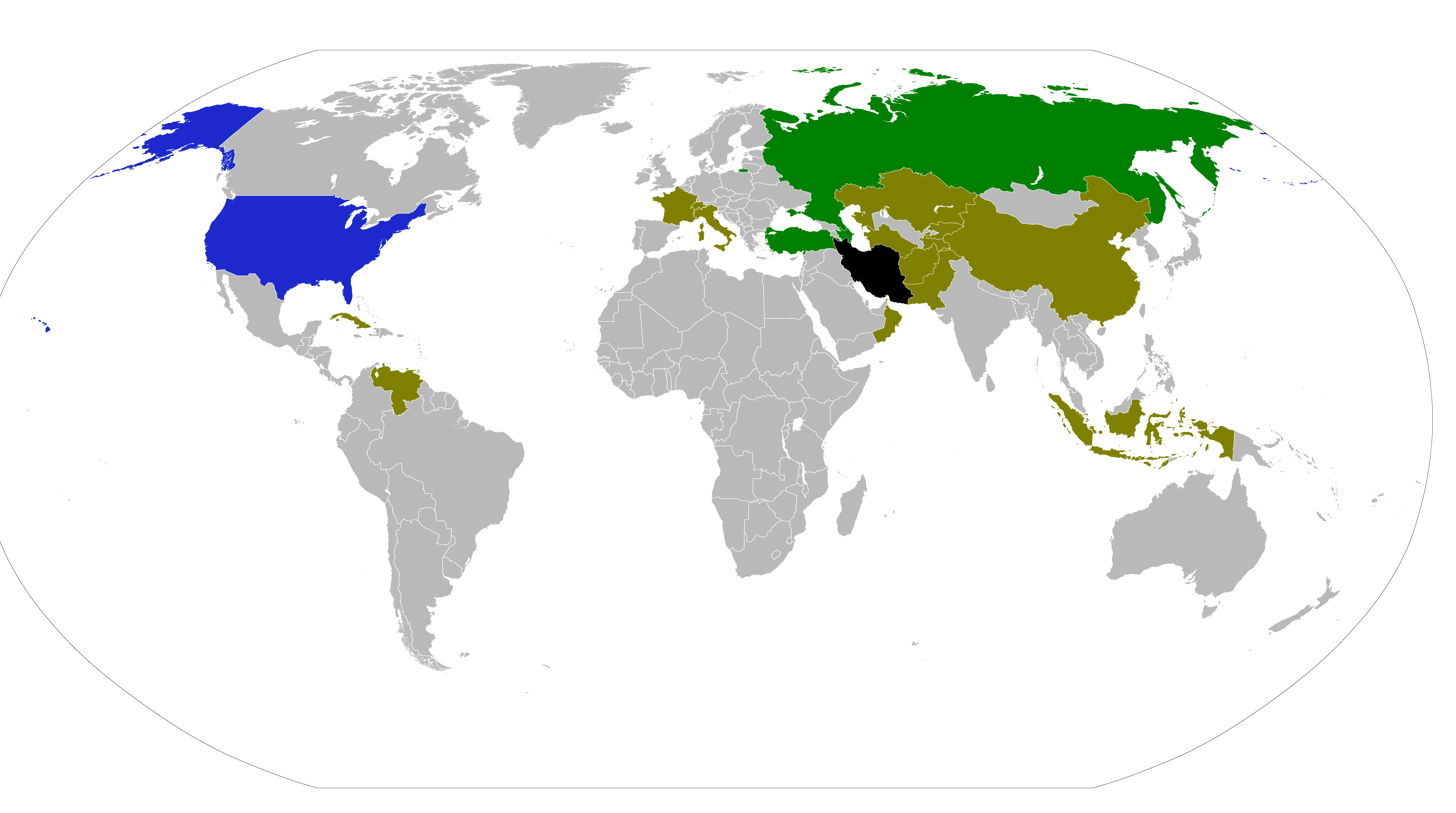
Map of international trips made by Hassan Rouhani as president

List of Trips
#	Start	End	Country	Cities
1	September 12, 2013	September 13, 2013	Kyrgyzstan	Bishkek
2	September 23, 2013	September 28, 2013	United Nations	New York City
3	January 22, 2014	January 24, 2014	Switzerland	Davos
4	March 11, 2014	March 13, 2014	Oman	Muscat
5	March 27, 2014	March 27, 2014	Afghanistan	Kabul
6	May 20, 2014	May 22, 2014	China	Shanghai
7	June 9, 2014	June 11, 2014	Turkey	Ankara
8	September 8, 2014	September 10, 2014	Kazakhstan	Astana
9	September 10, 2014	September 13, 2014	Tajikistan	Dushanbe
10	September 22, 2014	September 28, 2014	United Nations	New York City
11	September 28, 2014	September 30, 2014	Russia	Astrakhan
12	November 12, 2014	November 13, 2014	Azerbaijan	Baku
13	March 10, 2015	March 11, 2015	Turkmenistan	Ashgabat
14	April 21, 2015	April 23, 2015	Indonesia	Jakarta
15	July 8, 2015	July 10, 2015	Russia	Ufa
16	September 25, 2015	September 29, 2015	United Nations	New York City
17	January 25, 2016	January 27, 2016	Italy	Rome
18	January 26, 2016	January 26, 2016	Vatican City	Vatican City
19	January 27, 2016	January 29, 2016	France	Paris
20	March 25, 2016	March 26, 2016	Pakistan	Islamabad
21	April 13, 2016	April 15, 2016	Turkey	Istanbul, Ankara
22	August 7, 2016	August 9, 2016	Azerbaijan	Baku
23	September 16, 2016	September 19, 2016	Venezuela	Porlamar
24	September 19, 2016	September 20, 2016	Cuba	Havana
25	September 20, 2016	September 22, 2016	United Nations	New York City
26	October 5, 2016	October 7, 2016	Vietnam	Hanoi
27	October 7, 2016	October 8, 2016	Malaysia	Kuala Lumpur
28	October 8, 2016	October 10, 2016	Thailand	Bangkok
29	December 21, 2016	December 21, 2016	Armenia	Yerevan
30	December 21, 2016	December 22, 2016	Kazakhstan	Astana
31	December 22, 2016	December 23, 2016	Kyrgyzstan	Bishkek
32	February 15, 2017	February 15, 2017	Oman	Muscat
33	February 15, 2017	February 16, 2017	Kuwait	Kuwait City
34	February 28, 2017	March 1, 2017	Pakistan	Islamabad
35	March 27, 2017	March 28, 2017	Russia	Moscow
36	September 7, 2017	September 11, 2017	Kazakhstan	Astana
37	September 18, 2017	September 21, 2017	United Nations	New York City
38	November 22, 2017	November 23, 2017	Russia	Sochi
39	December 13, 2017	December 13, 2017	Turkey	Istanbul
40	February 15, 2018	February 17, 2018	India	Hyderabad; New Delhi
41	March 27, 2018	March 27, 2018	Turkmenistan	Ashgabat
42	March 28, 2018	March 28, 2018	Azerbaijan	Baku
43	April 4, 2018	April 4, 2018	Turkey	Ankara
44	May 18, 2018	May 18, 2018	Turkey	Istanbul
45	June 8, 2018	June 10, 2018	China	Qingdao
46	July 2, 2018	July 3, 2018	Switzerland	Zürich, Bern
47	July 3, 2018	July 4, 2018	Austria	Vienna
48	August 12, 2018	August 12, 2018	Kazakhstan	Aktau
49	September 23, 2018	September 27, 2018	United Nations	New York City
50	December 19, 2018	December 20, 2018	Turkey	Ankara
51	February 14, 2019	February 14, 2019	Russia	Sochi
52	March 11, 2019	March 14, 2019	Iraq	Baghdad, Karbala and Najaf
53	June 13, 2019	June 14, 2019	Kyrgyzstan	Bishkek
54	June 14, 2019	June 15, 2019	Tajikistan	Dushanbe
55	September 16, 2019	September 16, 2019	Turkey	Ankara
56	September 25, 2019	September 25, 2019	United Nations	New York City
57	October 1, 2019	October 1, 2019	Armenia	Yerevan
58	October 23, 2019	October 24, 2019	Azerbaijan	Baku
59	December 17, 2019	December 20, 2019	Malaysia	Kuala Lumpur
60	December 20, 2019	December 21, 2019	Japan	Tokyo

== President Mahmoud Ahmadinejad ==
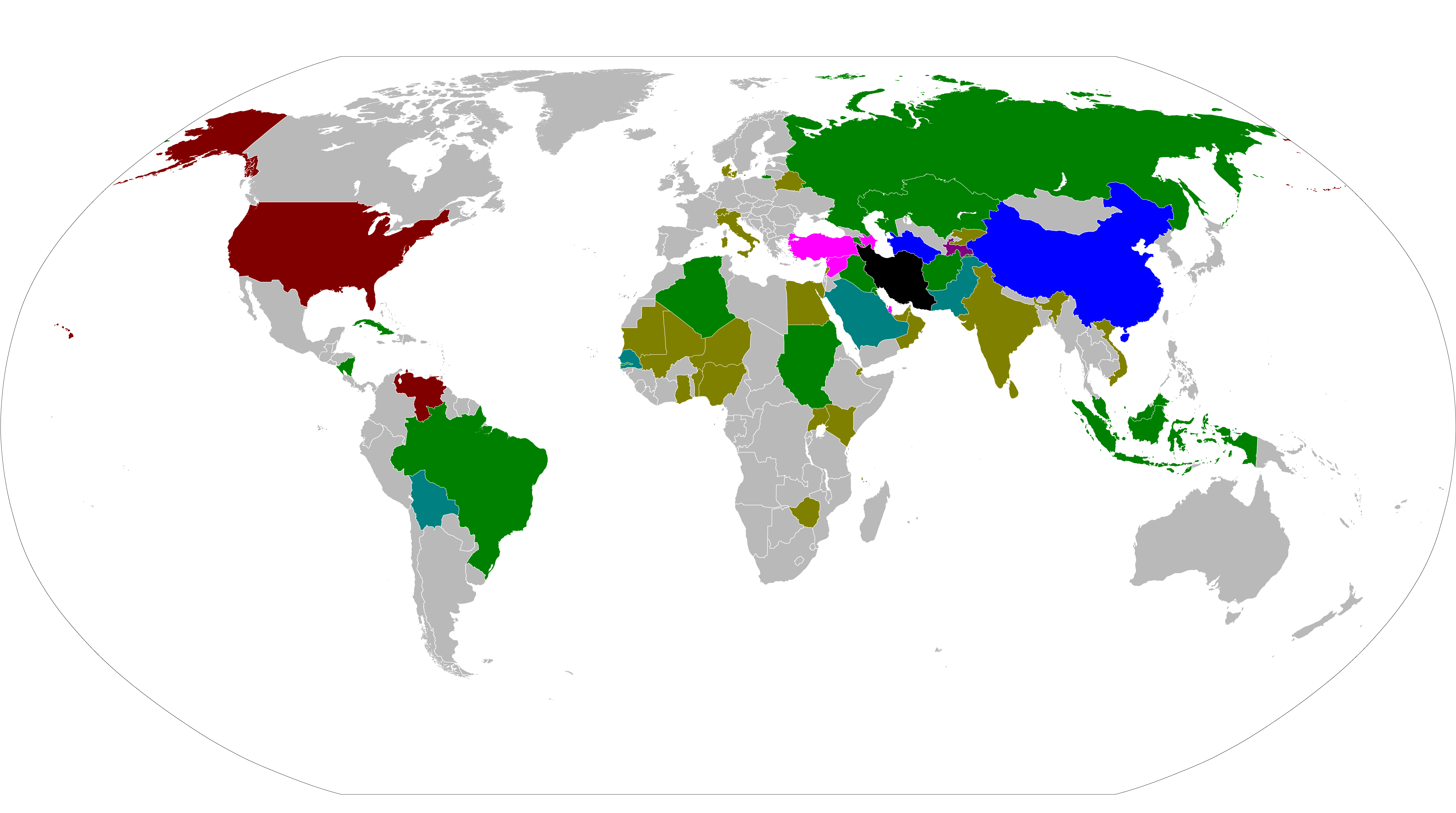
Map of international trips made by Mahmoud Ahmadinejad as president

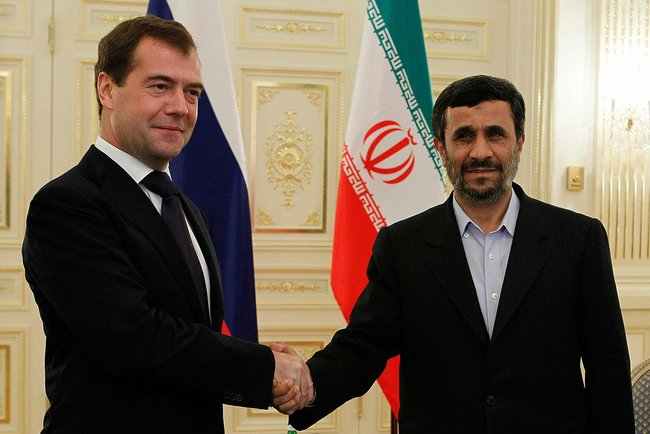
Mahmoud Ahmadinejad and Dmitry Medvedev in Baku

List of Trips
#	Start	End	Country	Cities
1	September 13, 2005	September 17, 2005	United Nations	New York City
2	December 20, 2005	December 21, 2005	Azerbaijan	Nakhchivan
3	January 19, 2006	January 20, 2006	Syria	Damascus
4	February 27, 2006	February 27, 2006	Kuwait	Kuwait City
5	February 29, 2006	March 1, 2006	Malaysia	Kuala Lumpur
6	May 5, 2006	May 5, 2006	Azerbaijan	Baku
7	May 13, 2006	May 13, 2006	Indonesia	Bali
8	June 14, 2006	June 15, 2006	China	Shanghai
9	July 2, 2006	July 2, 2006	Gambia	Banjul
10	July 24, 2006	July 25, 2006	Turkmenistan	Ashgabat
11	July 25, 2006	July 27, 2006	Tajikistan	Dushanbe
12	September 14, 2006	September 14, 2006	Cuba	Havana
13	September, 2006	September, 2006	Senegal	Dakar
14	September, 2006	September, 2006	Venezuela	Caracas
15	September 19, 2006	September 21, 2006	United Nations	New York City
16	December 5, 2006	December 5, 2006	Qatar	Doha
17	January, 2007	January, 2007	Venezuela	Caracas
18	January, 2007	January, 2007	Nicaragua	Managua
19	January, 2007	January, 2007	Ecuador	Quito
20	February 28, 2007	February 28, 2007	Sudan	Khartoum
21	March, 2007	March, 2007	Saudi Arabia	Riyadh
22	May 13, 2007	May 13, 2007	United Arab Emirates	Abu Dhabi
23	May 14, 2007	May 14, 2007	Oman	Muscat
24	May 21, 2007	May 21, 2007	Belarus	Minsk
25	July 19, 2007	July 19, 2007	Syria	Damascus
26	August 6, 2007	August 6, 2007	Algeria	Algiers
27	August 14, 2007	August, 2007	Afghanistan	Kabul
28	August 14, 2007	August, 2007	Turkmenistan	Ashgabat
29	August 15, 2007	August, 2007	Kyrgyzstan	Bishkek
30	August 21, 2007	August 21, 2007	Azerbaijan	Baku
31	September 23, 2007	September 26, 2007	United Nations	New York City
32	September 27, 2007	September 27, 2007	Bolivia	Sucre
33	September 28, 2007	September 28, 2007	Venezuela	Caracas
34	October 22, 2007	October 24, 2007	Armenia	Yerevan
35	November 17, 2007	November 17, 2007	Bahrain	Manama
36	November 17, 2007	November 17, 2007	Saudi Arabia	Riyadh (Note: The King of Saudi Arabia has invited Ahmadinejad to attend that year's Hajj in the Muslim holy city of Mecca from 18 December to 23 December.)
37	December 2, 2007	December 2, 2007	Qatar	Doha
38	March 1, 2008	March 1, 2008	Iraq	Baghdad
39	March 11, 2008	March 11, 2008	Senegal	Dakar
40	April 28, 2008	April 28, 2008	Pakistan	Islamabad
41	April 28, 2008	April 29, 2008	Sri Lanka	Colombo
42	April 30, 2008	April 30, 2008	India	New Delhi
43	June 3, 2008	June 3, 2008	Italy	Rome
44	July 6, 2008	June 8, 2008	Malaysia	Kuala Lumpur
45	August 14, 2008	August 14, 2008	Turkey	Ankara
46	August 26, 2008	August 28, 2008	Tajikistan	Dushanbe
47	September 5, 2008	September 5, 2008	China	Beijing
48	September 21, 2008	September 23, 2008	United Nations	New York City
49	October 22, 2008	October 22, 2008	Qatar	Doha
50	January 16, 2009	January 16, 2009	Qatar	Doha
51	March, 2009	March, 2009	Kenya	Nairobi
52	March, 2009	March, 2009	Comoros	Moroni
53	March, 2009	March, 2009	Djibouti	Djibouti City
54	April 12, 2009	April 12, 2009	Kazakhstan	Astana
55	April 20, 2009	April 24, 2009	Switzerland	Geneva
56	May 5, 2009	May 5, 2009	Syria	Damascus
57	June 15, 2009	June 16, 2009	Russia	Yekaterinburg
58	September 22, 2009	September 23, 2009	United Nations	New York City
59	November 7, 2009	November 8, 2009	Turkey	Istanbul
60	November 12, 2009	November 13, 2009	Gambia	Banjul
61	November 15, 2009	November 17, 2009	Brazil	Brasília
62	November 17, 2009	November 20, 2009	Bolivia	Sucre
63	November 20, 2009	November 24, 2009	Venezuela	Caracas
64	November 25, 2009	November 26, 2009	Senegal	Dakar
65	December 16, 2009	December 18, 2009	Denmark	Copenhagen
66	January 2, 2010	January 3, 2010	Tajikistan	Dushanbe
67	January 4, 2010	January 6, 2010	Turkmenistan	Ashgabat
68	February 25, 2010	February 25, 2010	Syria	Damascus
69	March, 2010	March, 2010	Afghanistan	Kabul
70	April 22, 2010	April 23, 2010	Zimbabwe	Harare
71	April 24, 2010	April 25, 2010	Uganda	Kampala
72	May 2, 2010	May 3, 2010	United Nations	New York City
73	June 7, 2010	June 7, 2010	Turkey	Ankara
74	June, 2010	June, 2010	Tajikistan	Dushanbe
75	June, 2010	June, 2010	China	Shanghai
76	July 6, 2010	July 6, 2010	Mali	Bamako
77	July 7, 2010	July 7, 2010	Nigeria	Abuja
78	September 5, 2010	September 5, 2010	Qatar	Doha
79	September 18, 2010	September 18, 2010	Syria	Damascus
80	September 18, 2010	September 18, 2010	Algeria	Algiers
81	September 19, 2010	September 21, 2010	United Nations	New York City
82	October 13, 2010	October 15, 2010	Lebanon	Beirut
83	November 17, 2010	November 18, 2010	Azerbaijan	Baku
84	December 23, 2010	December 23, 2010	Turkey	Istanbul
85	May 9, 2011	May 9, 2011	Turkey	Istanbul
86	June 14, 2011	June 15, 2011	Kazakhstan	Astana
87	October 5, 2011	October 5, 2011	Tajikistan	Dushanbe
88	September 19, 2011	September 25, 2011	United Nations	New York City
89	September 25, 2011	September 25, 2011	Mauritania	Nouakchott
90	September 26, 2011	September 28, 2011	Sudan	Khartoum
91	December 23, 2011	December 23, 2011	Armenia	Yerevan
92	January 8, 2012	January 8, 2012	Venezuela	Caracas
93	January 9, 2012	January 10, 2012	Nicaragua	Managua
94	January 11, 2012	January 13, 2012	Cuba	Havana
95	January 13, 2012	January 13, 2012	Ecuador	Quito
96	February 16, 2012	February 16, 2012	Pakistan	Islamabad
97	March 20, 2012	March 20, 2012	Tajikistan	Dushanbe
98	June 6, 2012	June 7, 2012	China	Beijing
99	June 11, 2012	June 13, 2012	Bolivia	Sucre
100	June 20, 2012	June 22, 2012	Brazil	Brasília
101	June, 2012	June, 2012	Venezuela	Caracas
102	August 13, 2012	August 15, 2012	Saudi Arabia	Mecca
103	September, 2012	September, 2012	United Nations	New York City
104	October 16, 2012	October 16, 2012	Azerbaijan	Baku
105	October 10, 2012	October 11, 2012	Kuwait	Kuwait City
106	November 7, 2012	November 11, 2012	Indonesia	Bali
107	November 11, 2012	November 11, 2012	Vietnam	Hanoi
108	November, 2012	November, 2012	Pakistan	Islamabad
109	February 6, 2013	February 7, 2013	Egypt	Cairo
110	March 8, 2013	March 8, 2013	Venezuela	Caracas
111	March 20, 2013	March 20, 2013	Turkmenistan	Ashgabat
112	April 14, 2013	April, 2013	Benin	Porto-Novo
113	April, 2013	April, 2013	Niger	Niamey
114	April, 2013	April, 2013	Ghana	Accra
115	April 19, 2013	April 19, 2013	Venezuela	Caracas
116	July 1, 2013	July 1, 2013	Russia	Moscow
117	July 18, 2013	July 19, 2013	Iraq	Baghdad, Karbala and Najaf

== President Mohammad Khatami ==
List of Trips
#	Start	End	Country	Cities
	December 28, 1997	December 29, 1997	Turkmenistan	Ashgabat
	May 10, 1998	May 11, 1998	Kazakhstan	Almaty
	September 1, 1998	September 3, 1998	South Africa	Durban
	September 19, 1998	September 23, 1998	United Nations	New York City
	March 9, 1999	March 12, 1999	Italy	Rome
	March 12, 1999	March 12, 1999	Vatican City	Vatican City
	May 13, 1999	May 15, 1999	Syria	Damascus
	May 15, 1999	May 19, 1999	Saudi Arabia	Jeddah, Mecca, Medina and Dhahran
	May 19, 1999	May 20, 1999	Qatar	Doha
	October 27, 1999	October 29, 1999	France	Paris
	June 13, 2000	June 13, 2000	Syria	Damascus
	June 22, 2000	June 26, 2000	China	Beijing, Urumqi, Kashgar and Hong Kong
	July 10, 2000	July 12, 2000	Germany	Berlin, Weimar
	September 3, 2000	September 9, 2000	United Nations	New York City
	September 26, 2000	September 26, 2000	Spain	Madrid
	September 27, 2000	September 29, 2000	Venezuela	Caracas
	September 30, 2000	October 2, 2000	Cuba	Havana
	October 30, 2000	November 3, 2000	Japan	Tokyo
	November 12, 2000	November 13, 2000	Qatar	Doha
	March 12, 2001	March 15, 2001	Russia	Moscow, Saint Petersburg and Kazan
	November 8, 2001	November 13, 2001	United Nations	New York City
	March 11, 2002	March 13, 2002	Austria	Vienna
	March 13, 2002	March 15, 2002	Greece	Athens
	April 22, 2002	April 24, 2002	Turkmenistan	Ashgabat
	April 24, 2002	April 25, 2002	Kazakhstan	Almaty
	April 26, 2002	April 28, 2002	Uzbekistan	Tashkent, Samarkand, Bukhara
	April 28, 2002	April 29, 2002	Kyrgyzstan	Bishkek
	April 30, 2002	May 1, 2002	Tajikistan	Dushanbe, Kulob
	July 21, 2002	July 24, 2002	Malaysia	Kuala Lumpur
	August 13, 2002	August 13, 2002	Afghanistan	Kabul
	September 11, 2002	September 14, 2002	Saudi Arabia	Medina, Mecca and Jeddah
	October 13, 2002	October 15, 2002	Turkey	Istanbul
	October 15, 2002	October 16, 2002	Ukraine	Kyiv
	October 28, 2002	October 31, 2002	Spain	Madrid, Granada
	December 23, 2002	December 25, 2002	Pakistan	Islamabad, Lahore
	January 26, 2003	January 28, 2003	India	New Delhi, Hyderabad
	February 23, 2003	February 26, 2003	Malaysia	Kuala Lumpur
	May 12, 2003	May 14, 2003	Lebanon	Beirut
	May 14, 2003	May 15, 2003	Syria	Damascus
	May 15, 2003	May 16, 2003	Yemen	Sanaa
	May 16, 2003	May 17, 2003	Bahrain	Manama
	October 15, 2003	October 18, 2003	Malaysia	Putrajaya
	December 10, 2003	December 12, 2003	Switzerland	Geneva
	January 19, 2004	January 22, 2004	Switzerland	Zürich, Bern and Davos
	February 26, 2004	February 29, 2004	Venezuela	Caracas
	August 5, 2004	August 7, 2004	Azerbaijan	Baku, Ganja
	September 8, 2004	September 9, 2004	Armenia	Yerevan
	September 10, 2004	September 11, 2004	Belarus	Minsk
	September 11, 2004	September 14, 2004	Tajikistan	Dushanbe
	October 2, 2004	October 4, 2004	Algeria	Algiers
	October 4, 2004	October 6, 2004	Sudan	Khartoum
	October 6, 2004	October 7, 2004	Oman	Muscat
	October 7, 2004	October 7, 2004	Syria	Damascus
	January 11, 2005	January 13, 2005	Nigeria	Abuja
	January 13, 2005	January 15, 2005	Senegal	Dakar
	January 15, 2005	January 15, 2005	Sierra Leone	Freetown
	January 15, 2005	January 16, 2005	Mali	Bamako
	January 16, 2005	January 17, 2005	Benin	Porto-Novo
	January 17, 2005	January 19, 2005	Zimbabwe	Harare
	January 19, 2005	January 20, 2005	Uganda	Kampala
	March 7, 2005	March 8, 2005	Croatia	Zagreb
	March 8, 2005	March 10, 2005	Bosnia and Herzegovina	Sarajevo
	March 11, 2005	March 13, 2005	Venezuela	Caracas, Ciudad Bolívar
	April 4, 2005	April 4, 2005	Austria	Vienna
	April 4, 2005	April 7, 2005	France	Paris
	April 7, 2005	April 8, 2005	Italy	Rome
	April 8, 2005	April 8, 2005	Vatican City	Vatican City

== President Akbar Hashemi Rafsanjani ==
List of Trips
#	Start	End	Country	Cities
	April 27, 1991	April 29, 1991	Syria	Damascus
	April 29, 1991	May 2, 1991	Turkey	Ankara, Konya, Istanbul
	December 8, 1991	December 13, 1991	Senegal	Dakar, Touba
	December 13, 1991	December 16, 1991	Sudan	Khartoum, Al-hasaheisa
	May 9, 1992	May 11, 1992	Turkmenistan	Ashgabat, Mary
	August 30, 1992	September 6, 1992	Indonesia	Jakarta
	September 6, 1992	September 9, 1992	Pakistan	Islamabad, Lahore
	September 9, 1992	September 12, 1992	China	Beijing, Urumqi, Kashghar
	July 5, 1993	July 7, 1993	Turkey	Istanbul
	October 18, 1993	October 20, 1993	Uzbekistan	Tashkent, Samarkand, Bukhara
	October 20, 1993	October 22, 1993	Kyrgyzstan	Bishkek, Issyk Kul
	October 22, 1993	October 25, 1993	Turkmenistan	Ashkhabad, Kohne Urgench, Dashkhavuz, Turkmenbashi
	October 25, 1993	October 26, 1993	Kazakhstan	Almaty, Aktau
	October 26, 1993	October 28, 1993	Azerbaijan	Baku
	October 12, 1994	October 15, 1994	Indonesia	Jakarta, Bandung
	October 15, 1994	October 17, 1994	Brunei	Bandar Seri Begawan
	October 17, 1994	October 19, 1994	Malaysia	Kuala Lumpur
	October 26, 1994	October 27, 1994	Turkmenistan	Ashgabat
	March 13, 1995	March 15, 1995	Pakistan	Islamabad
	April 17, 1995	April 19, 1995	India	New Delhi, Lucknow
	April 19, 1995	April 21, 1995	Georgia	Tbilisi, Batumi
	October 4, 1995	October 8, 1995	Vietnam	Hanoi, Ho Chi Minh City
	October 8, 1995	October 10, 1995	Philippines	Manila
	October 10, 1995	October 13, 1995	Bangladesh	Dhaka, Chittagong
	May 13, 1996	May 15, 1996	Turkmenistan	Ashgabat
	September 2, 1996	September 5, 1996	Kenya	Nairobi, Mombasa
	September 5, 1996	September 8, 1996	Uganda	Kampala, Jinja
	September 8, 1996	September 9, 1996	Sudan	Khartoum
	September 9, 1996	September 11, 1996	Tanzania	Dar es Salaam, Zanzibar City
	September 11, 1996	September 12, 1996	Zimbabwe	Harare
	September 12, 1996	September 14, 1996	South Africa	Johannesburg
	December 19, 1996	December 22, 1996	Turkey	Ankara, Şanlıurfa, İzmir
	March 22, 1997	March 24, 1997	Pakistan	Islamabad
	May 9, 1997	May 11, 1997	Tajikistan	Dushanbe, Kulob,
	May 11, 1997	May 14, 1997	Turkmenistan	Türkmenabat, Ashgabat, Mary
	June 14, 1997	June 15, 1997	Turkey	Istanbul

== President Ali Khamenei ==
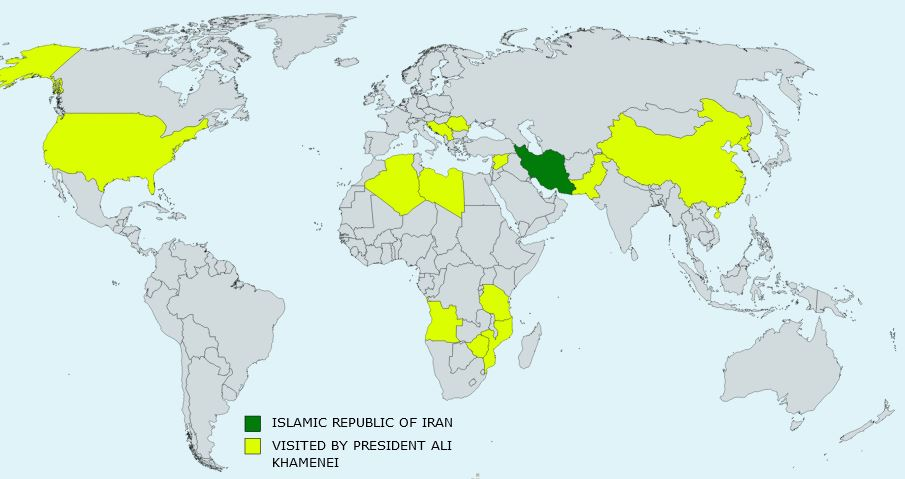

List of Trips
#	Start	End	Country	Cities
1	September 5, 1984	September, 1984	Syria	Damascus
2	September, 1984	September, 1984	Libya	Tripoli
3	September, 1984	September 10, 1984	Algeria	Algiers
4	January 13, 1986	January, 1986	Pakistan	Islamabad; Lahore
5	January, 1986	January, 1986	Tanzania	Dodoma; Dar es Salaam
6	January, 1986	January, 1986	Zimbabwe	Harare
7	January, 1986	January, 1986	Angola	Luanda
8	January, 1986	January 22, 1986	Mozambique	Maputo
9	September 1, 1986	September 6, 1986	Zimbabwe	Harare
10	September 22, 1987	September 23, 1987	United Nations	New York City
11	February 20, 1989	February, 1989	Yugoslavia	Belgrade
12	February, 1989	February, 1989	SR Bosnia and Herzegovina	Sarajevo
13	February, 1989	February, 1989	Romania	Bucharest
14	May 9, 1989	May 1989	China	Beijing
15	May, 1989	May 15, 1989	North Korea	Pyongyang

== See also ==
- List of state visits made by kings of Iran
- Foreign relations of Iran
