= List of international prime ministerial trips made by Zulfikar Ali Bhutto =

This is a list of international prime ministerial trips made by Zulfikar Ali Bhutto, the 9th Prime Minister of Pakistan.

== 1973 ==
Country	Date/s	Engagements	Ref.
United States	18–20 September	Official visit to the United States. Met President Richard Nixon in Washington, D.C., and then travelled to New York City, where he visited United Nations Headquarters and addressed the 28th session of the United Nations General Assembly.	

== 1974 ==
Country	Date/s	Engagements	Ref.
China	11–14 May	Official visit to Peking. Met Chairman Mao Zedong and Premier Zhou Enlai; a joint communiqué was issued at the conclusion of the visit.	
Bangladesh	27–29 June	Official visit to Dhaka. Met Prime Minister Sheikh Mujibur Rahman and President Mohammad Mohammadullah.	
Soviet Union	24–26 October	Official visit to Moscow. Held talks with Premier Alexei Kosygin and other Soviet leaders on bilateral relations and regional issues.	

== 1975 ==
Country	Date/s	Engagements	Ref.
United States	4–7 February	Official visit to the United States. Met President Gerald Ford and Secretary of State Henry Kissinger in Washington; a joint statement was issued at the conclusion of the visit.	
France	20–22 October	Official visit to Paris. Met President Valéry Giscard d'Estaing and Prime Minister Jacques Chirac; talks covered economic, industrial and nuclear cooperation.	
Sri Lanka	16–19 December	Official visit to Colombo. Met Prime Minister Sirimavo Bandaranaike and addressed the National State Assembly.	

== 1976 ==
Country	Date/s	Engagements	Ref.
Turkey	21–22 April	Attended the fifth summit of Regional Cooperation for Development in İzmir, together with President Fahri Korutürk of Turkey and the Shah of Iran.	
China	26–30 May	Official visit to Peking. Met Chairman Mao Zedong and Premier Hua Guofeng; a joint communiqué and agreements on scientific, technical, economic and trade cooperation were signed.	
Afghanistan	7–11 June	Official visit to Kabul. Held summit talks with President Mohammed Daoud Khan; the two sides agreed to continue dialogue and to observe the principles of territorial integrity and non-interference.	
