= 4th ECO Summit =

1996 ECO Summit
- Host country: Turkmenistan
- Date: 14–15 May 1996
- Cities: Ashgabat
- Follows: Islamabad 1995
- Precedes: Almaty 1998
- Website: 4th Summit Declaration

The 1996 ECO summit was the fourth Economic Cooperation Organization summit, held from 14 to 15 May 1996 in Ashgabat, Turkmenistan.

== Attending delegations ==
- President Burhanuddin Rabbani – Afghanistan
- President Heydar Aliyev – Azerbaijan
- President Akbar Hashemi Rafsanjani – Iran
- President Nursultan Nazarbaev – Kazakhstan
- President Askar Akaev – Kyrgyzstan
- President Farooq Ahmad Khan Leghari – Pakistan
- Chairman Emomali Rahman – Tajikistan
- President Süleyman Demirel – Turkey
- President Saparmyrat Nyýazow – Turkmenistan
- President Islam Karimov – Uzbekistan
