= 13th ECO Summit =

2017 ECO Summit
- Host country: Pakistan
- Date: 27 February – 1 March 2017
- Motto: Connectivity for Regional Prosperity
- Cities: Islamabad
- Venues: Jinnah Convention Centre, Islamabad Serena Hotel
- Follows: Baku 2012
- Precedes: Tehran 2018
- Website: ECO

The 2017 ECO summit was the 13th summit of the Economic Cooperation Organization, held on 1 March 2017 in Islamabad, Pakistan.

The Summit was preceded by the 22nd Meeting of the ECO Council of Foreign Ministers (COM) on 28 February 2017 in Islamabad. Senior Officials from Member States met on 27 February 2017 in Islamabad and stayed for the duration of the summit.

The summit highlighted the state of affairs of ECO in the light of the new and emerging global and regional circumstances and agreed on expanding regional economic cooperation among its member states. The new ECO Vision 2025 was expanded upon and several key guidelines have been taken into account. Pakistan plans to integrate the ECO Summit members with the China–Pakistan Economic Corridor.

== Venue ==
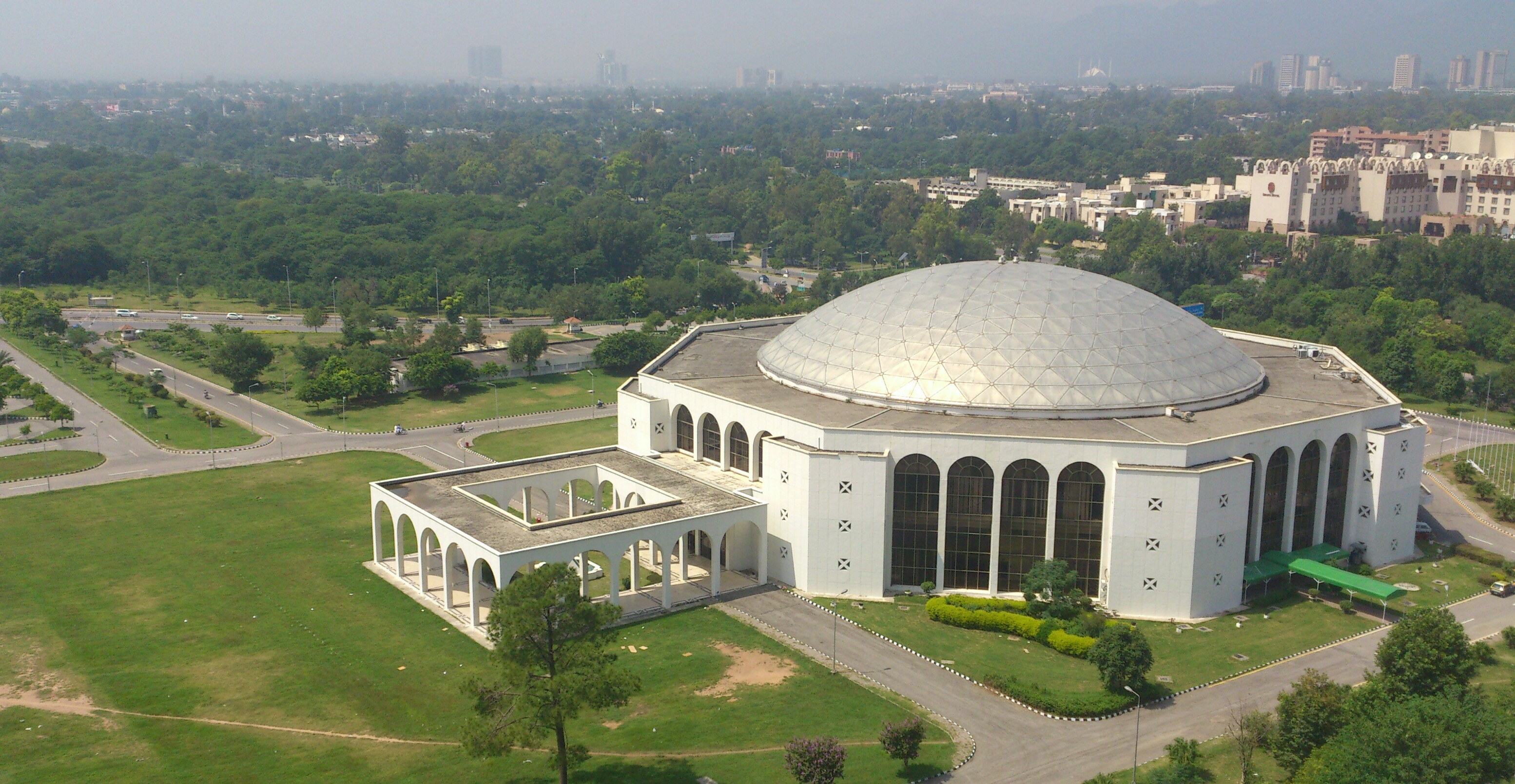
Jinnah Convention Centre hosted most of the meetings.

According to The News International, Islamabad intended to use the five billion rupees' worth of resources initially allocated for 19th SAARC summit, will be used for ECO Summit. Prime Minister Sharif also hosted an informal dinner in the honour of Turkish President Recep Tayyip Erdoğan and his wife Emine Erdoğan at the Prime Ministers House.

== Security Plan ==
On February 27, 2017, Pakistan's Ministry of Interior drafted a comprehensive security plan for the summit. Under the plan, local holiday was declared in the Islamabad-Rawalpindi metropolitan area on March 1 while on February 28, after 1 pm, educational institutions and offices were to be closed. Kashmir Highway will also be partially closed during the summit. The army was given responsibility for the security of the Red Zone within the city.

== Participants ==
Delegation Head	Delegation Country
Omar Zakhilwal	Afghanistan
**Ilham Aliyev**	**Azerbaijan**
**Hassan Rouhani**	**Iran**
**Nursultan Nazarbayev**	**Kazakhstan**
Sooronbay Jeenbekov	Kyrgyzstan
Nawaz Sharif	Pakistan
Kokhir Rasulzoda	Tajikistan
**Recep Tayyip Erdoğan**	**Turkey**
**Gurbanguly Berdimuhamedow**	**Turkmenistan**
Rustam Azimov	Uzbekistan
_{Heads of state are in bold}
