= ECO Science Foundation =

ECO Science Foundation (ECOSF) is an intergovernmental organization and a specialized agency of the Economic Cooperation Organization (ECO). It was established in Islamabad, Pakistan in December 2011, with holding of the first meeting of Board of Trustees (BoT), the highest decision making body. ECOSF aims to promote scientific and technology research with an end goal to raise socio-economic standing of ten member states (Afghanistan, Azerbaijan, Iran, Kazakhstan, Kyrgyz Republic, Pakistan, Tajikistan, Turkey, Turkmenistan and Uzbekistan).
