= Yahya Maroofi =

Afghan diplomat

Mohammad Yahya Maroofi (or Maroufi) (born March 5, 1939, in Kabul) is an Afghan ethnic Pashtun from the Barakzai tribe. His family is from District Maroof Kandahar, Afghanistan.

== Diplomatic career ==
He was nominated on February 2, 2002, as special adviser to Hamid Karzai, President of the Interim Government of Afghanistan. Maroofi has been re-conduct on August 5, 2002, in his position following the re-election of Karzai as President during the Loya Jirga in June 2002. On November 1, 2004, Maroofi served as Ambassador of Afghanistan to Scandinavia, resident in Oslo between 2005 and 2007. From May 2007 to August 2009 he was appointed as Afghan Ambassador to the Islamic Republic of Iran. In September 2009 Mr. Yahya Maroofi was elected Secretary General of the Economic Cooperation Organization (ECO). On the termination of his assignment as Secretary General of ECO on 13 August 2012 Mr. Maroofi was reappointed as Minister, Adviser to the president of Afghanistan on International Relations. He assumed this function till the end of President Karzai's second term in office (2014). During his assignment, Mr. Maroofi has taken active part in numerous international meetings and conferences and traveled extensively throughout the world representing Afghanistan. His numerous essays and collection of speeches are recorded in the archive of ECO, IOM and Ministry of Foreign Affairs of Afghanistan.

Prior to returning to Kabul in 2002, Mr. Maroofi worked with the International Organisation for Migration as Executive Director for Asia (from 1997 to 2001) and Special Envoy responsible for dossiers involving Afghan refugees in Iran, Pakistan and Tajikistan. Maroofi started in the Organization for Migrations as a Consultant for refugees matters in Africa after he and his family had left Afghanistan further the Soviet invasion. Maroofi took care of dossiers involving cross border refugees during political crisis in Iraq, Kenya, Tanzania and Somalia from 1985 to 1992. Currently he is the general secretary of Economic Cooperation Organization.

Maroofi started his career in the Afghan diplomatic service where he held numerous positions. His last post was Director of the Department of International Relations and United Nations Affairs. After the Soviet invasion, Mr. Maroofi and his family sought refuge in Switzerland. Mr. Maroofi is married to Mrs. Soraya Ludin Maroofi. They have two children, a son names Yama and a daughter names Sabrina.

== Education ==
Maroofi graduated in Law from Kabul University, holds a master's degree in International Relations from the University of Sydney and a master's degree in International Law from the Fairleigh Dickinson University, New Jersey.
