= Istanbul–Tehran–Islamabad railway =

International freight train corridor

Istanbul–Tehran–Islamabad Railway

Overview
- Status: Active
- Locale: Turkey; Iran; Pakistan

History
- Opened: 14 August 2009; 17 years ago

Technical
- Line length: 6,560 kilometres (4,080 mi)

Istanbul–Tehran–Islamabad railway (commonly the ITI train) is an international freight rail corridor linking Islamabad, Tehran and Istanbul. The route connects Pakistan with the Islamic Republic of Iran and Turkey to provide an overland freight corridor between South Asia, West Asia and Europe. The service has operated intermittently since a trial run in 2009 and was restarted for a series of cargo runs in December 2021. Pakistan, Iran and Turkey have announced plans to resume regular operations again by the end of 2025.

== Route and infrastructure ==
The ITI corridor runs from Islamabad and major Pakistani railheads (via Lahore, Sukkur and Quetta) across the Iran–Pakistan border at Taftan to Zahedan in Iran, continuing to Tehran and onwards into Turkey to Istanbul (and in some runs to Ankara). Total route length roughly at 6,560 km, depending on exact origin/destination terminals and routing.

There is a break-of-gauge between Iran Railways, Standard gauge (1435mm) and Pakistan Railways, 5 ft 6 in (1,676 mm) broad gauge at Zahedan. Containers are trans-shipped at the break-of-gauge. Proposals for improved transhipment terminals and gauge-changing facilities (VGA) have been discussed to speed up operations.

== History ==
A trial freight service between Pakistan and Turkey via Iran ran in August 2009. The corridor lay dormant for much of the 2010s owing to operational, infrastructural and diplomatic obstacles. In December 2021 the three countries relaunched a series of trial freight runs, the inaugural resumption departure left Islamabad on 21 December 2021 and reached Turkey in around two weeks, reportedly carrying Pakistani pink salt and other consignments. Subsequent runs were made in early 2022 despite winter weather challenges.

== Operations and cargo ==
The ITI service has been operated as a freight (cargo) corridor rather than a scheduled passenger service. Demonstration cargoes carried in the 2021–22 resumption included bulk commodities (for example pink salt). The service aims to provide an overland alternative for freight between South Asia and Europe, reduce transit times compared with maritime routes for some cargoes and strengthen trade routes within the Economic Cooperation Organization (ECO) region.

== Revival plans (2024–2025) ==
After intermittent operations in 2021–22, Pakistani authorities and their regional partners announced further plans to restore regular ITI freight operations. In October 2025 Pakistan's Federal Minister for Railways said the government plans to restart ITI freight services from 31 December 2025, conditional on finalising trade lists, logistics agreements and operational arrangements with Iran and Turkey. Talks and preparatory steps including infrastructure upgrades and agreements on consignable goods started in October 2025.

== See also ==
- Trans-Asian Railway
- Economic Cooperation Organization
