= 2nd ECO Summit =

1993 ECO Summit
- Host country: Turkey
- Date: 6–7 May 1993
- Cities: Istanbul
- Follows: Tehran 1992
- Precedes: Islamabad 1995
- Website: 2nd ECO Summit Report

The 1993 ECO summit was the second Economic Cooperation Organization summit, held between 6–7 May in Istanbul, Turkey. Afghanistan was welcomed as the 10th member state of the ECO during the summit.

== Attending delegations ==
- President Burhanuddin Rabbani – Afghanistan
- Vice Prime Minister Rasul Guliyev – Azerbaijan
- President Hashemi Rafsanjani – Iran
- President Nursultan Nazarbaev – Kazakhstan
- President Askar Akaev – Kyrgyzstan
- Prime Minister Nawaz Sharif – Pakistan
- Chairman Emomali Rahmonov – Tajikistan
- President Suleyman Demirel – Turkey
- President Saparmyrat Nyýazow – Turkmenistan
- President Islam Karimov – Uzbekistan
