= 3rd ECO Summit =

1995 ECO Summit
- Host country: Pakistan
- Date: 14–15 May 1995
- Cities: Islamabad
- Follows: Istanbul 1993
- Precedes: Ashgabat 1996
- Website: Second ECO Summit Report

The 1995 ECO summit was the third Economic Cooperation Organization summit, held 14–15 May 1995 in Islamabad, Pakistan.

== Attending delegations ==
- President Burhanuddin Rabbani – Afghanistan
- President Heydar Aliyev – Azerbaijan
- President Akbar Hashemi Rafsanjani – Iran
- First Deputy Prime Minister Nigmatjan K. Isingarin – Kazakhstan
- President Askar Akaev – Kyrgyzstan
- Prime Minister Benazir Bhutto – Pakistan
- Chairman Emomali Rahman – Tajikistan
- President Suleyman Demirel – Turkey
- President Saparmyrat Nyýazow – Turkmenistan
