= Economic Cooperation Organization Secretariat =

International organization overseeing economic cooperation in Asia

General information
- Location: Tehran, Iran
- Client: ECO

Website
- About ECO

The Economic Cooperation Organization Secretariat is located in the Kamranieh neighborhood of Tehran, the capital city of Iran.

The headquarters coordinates and monitors the implementation of activities, prepares for and services meetings, and serves as a channel of communication between the Association and its Member States and other regional organizations. The ECO Secretariat comprises six directorates under the supervision of the Secretary-General and deputies. Two specialized agencies and six regional institutes are acting under the supervision of the General Secretariat.
