= 1st ECO Summit =

1992 ECO Summit
- Host country: Iran
- Date: 16–17 February 1992
- Cities: Tehran
- Precedes: 1993 Istanbul
- Website: ECO Summits

The 1992 ECO summit was the first Economic Cooperation Organization summit, held 16–17 February in Tehran, Iran. The summit welcomed the admission of new members Azerbaijan, Turkmenistan, Uzbekistan, Tajikistan and Kyrgyzstan as well as allowing limited participation in economic, cultural and technical activities of Northern Cyprus.

== Attending delegations ==
Government leaders
Hashemi Rafsanjani	President	Iran
Nawaz Sharif	Prime Minister	Pakistan
Turgut Ozal	President	Turkey
Ekrem Ceyhun	Minister of State	Turkey
Ayaz Mutallibov	President	Azerbaijan
Saparmurat Niyazov	President	Turkmenistan
Bayknev	Deputy Prime Minister	Kazakhstan
Erkibayev	Deputy Prime Minister	Kyrgyzstan
Yuldashov Shokat Mohyedinouvich	Chairman of the High Council	Uzbekistan
Lakim Qayumov	Foreign Minister	Tajikistan
