= List of official overseas trips made by monarchs of Iran =

This is a list of international trips made by the monarchs of Iran in the modern era (19th–20th centuries).

== Qajar dynasty ==
=== Naser al-Din Shah ===
Date(s)	City and country	Details
1873
May 1873	Russian Empire	First European trip made by a monarch of Iran in the modern era meeting with Emperor Alexander II receiving Order of St. Andrew, Order of Saint Alexander Nevsky, Order of Saint Stanislaus and Order of Saint Anna
1873	German Empire; Prussia	meeting with Emperor William I and Otto von Bismarck and receiving Order of the Black Eagle and Order of the Red Eagle
1873	Belgium	meeting with King Leopold II of the Belgians and receiving Order of Leopold
1873	United Kingdom of Great Britain and Ireland	meeting with Queen Victoria and receiving Order of the Garter
1873	France	meeting with President Patrice de MacMahon
1873	Switzerland	
1873	Italy	meeting with Victor Emmanuel II
1873	Austria-Hungary	meeting with Franz Joseph I
1873	Ottoman Empire	
1878
May 1878	Russian Empire	meeting with Emperor Alexander II
May 1878	German Empire; Prussia	meeting with Emperor William I
1878	France	meeting with President Patrice de MacMahon, Duke of Magenta
1878	Austria-Hungary	meeting with Franz Joseph I
1889
1889	Russian Empire	meeting with Alexander III
1889	United Kingdom of Great Britain and Ireland	meeting with Queen Victoria
1889	France	meeting with President Marie François Sadi Carnot
1889	Ottoman Empire	meeting with Abdul Hamid II

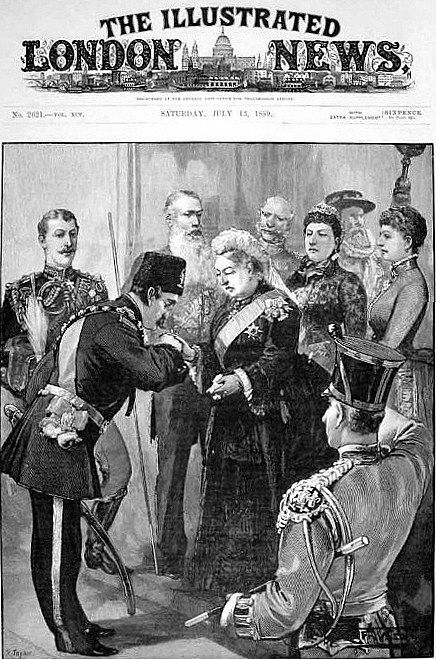
The Shah and Queen Victoria in 1873

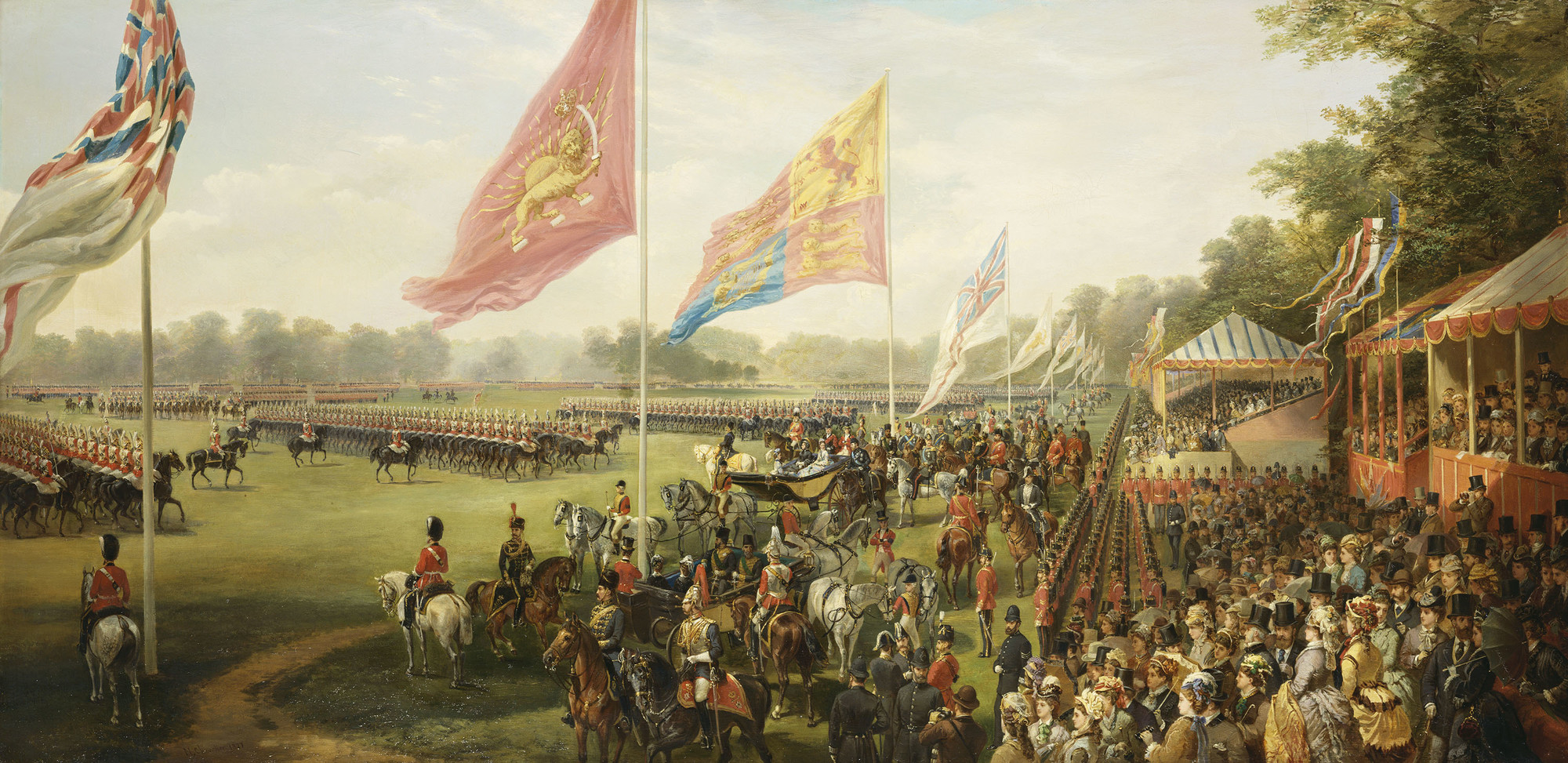
The Review in Windsor Great Park in Honour of the Shah of Persia, 24 June 1873

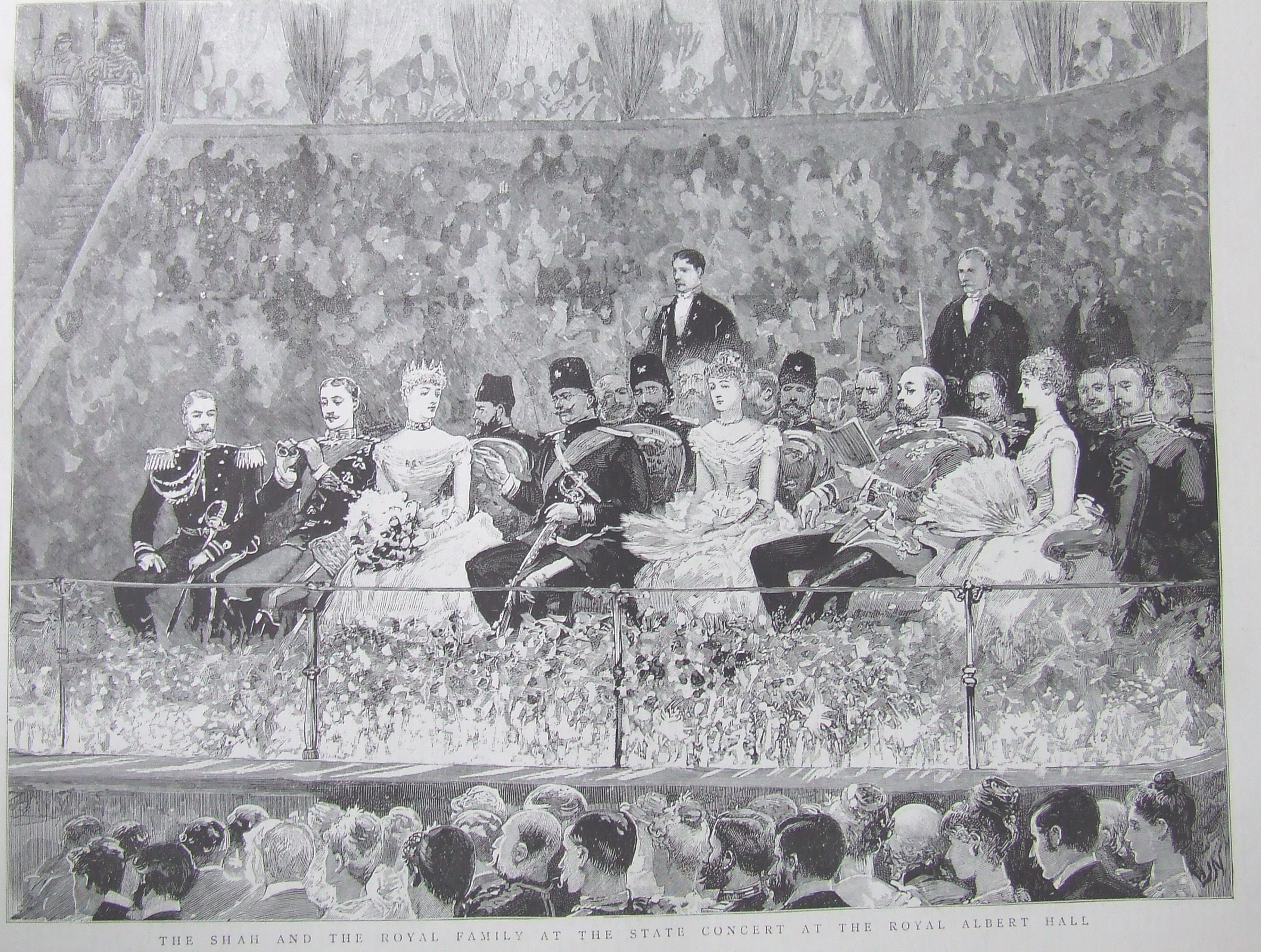
The Shah and the British royal family in 1889

=== Mozaffar ad-Din Shah ===
Date(s)	City and country	Details
1898
1898	Russian Empire	
1898	Austria-Hungary	
1898	Switzerland	
1898	German Empire; Prussia	
1898	Belgium	
1898	France	
1898	Ottoman Empire	
1902-3
1902	Austria-Hungary	
1902	German Empire; Prussia	receiving Order of the Black Eagle
1902	Belgium	
1902	France	
1902	Italy	receiving Supreme Order of the Most Holy Annunciation
1903	United Kingdom of Great Britain and Ireland	
1905
1905	German Empire; Prussia	
1905	Austria-Hungary	
1905	Belgium	
1905	France	
1905	Russian Empire	

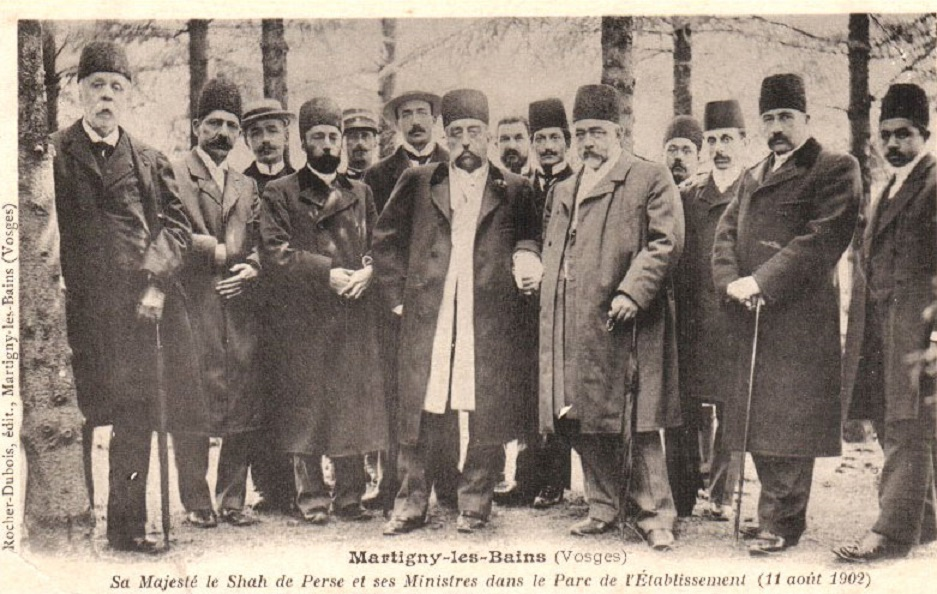
The Shah and his retinue taking the waters at a French spa in 1902

=== Ahmad Shah ===
Date(s)	City and country	Details
1919–20
October	France	
1919 – May 1920	United Kingdom of Great Britain and Ireland	meeting with King George V
1922
January	France	
1922 – December 1922	United Kingdom of Great Britain and Ireland	
1923
4 November 1923 – 21 February 1930	France	Turned his trip into exile after being overthrown by Sardar Sepah

== Pahlavi dynasty ==
=== Reza Shah ===
Date(s)	City and country	Details
1934
16 June – 12 July 1934	Turkey	meeting with president Mustafa Kemal Atatürk

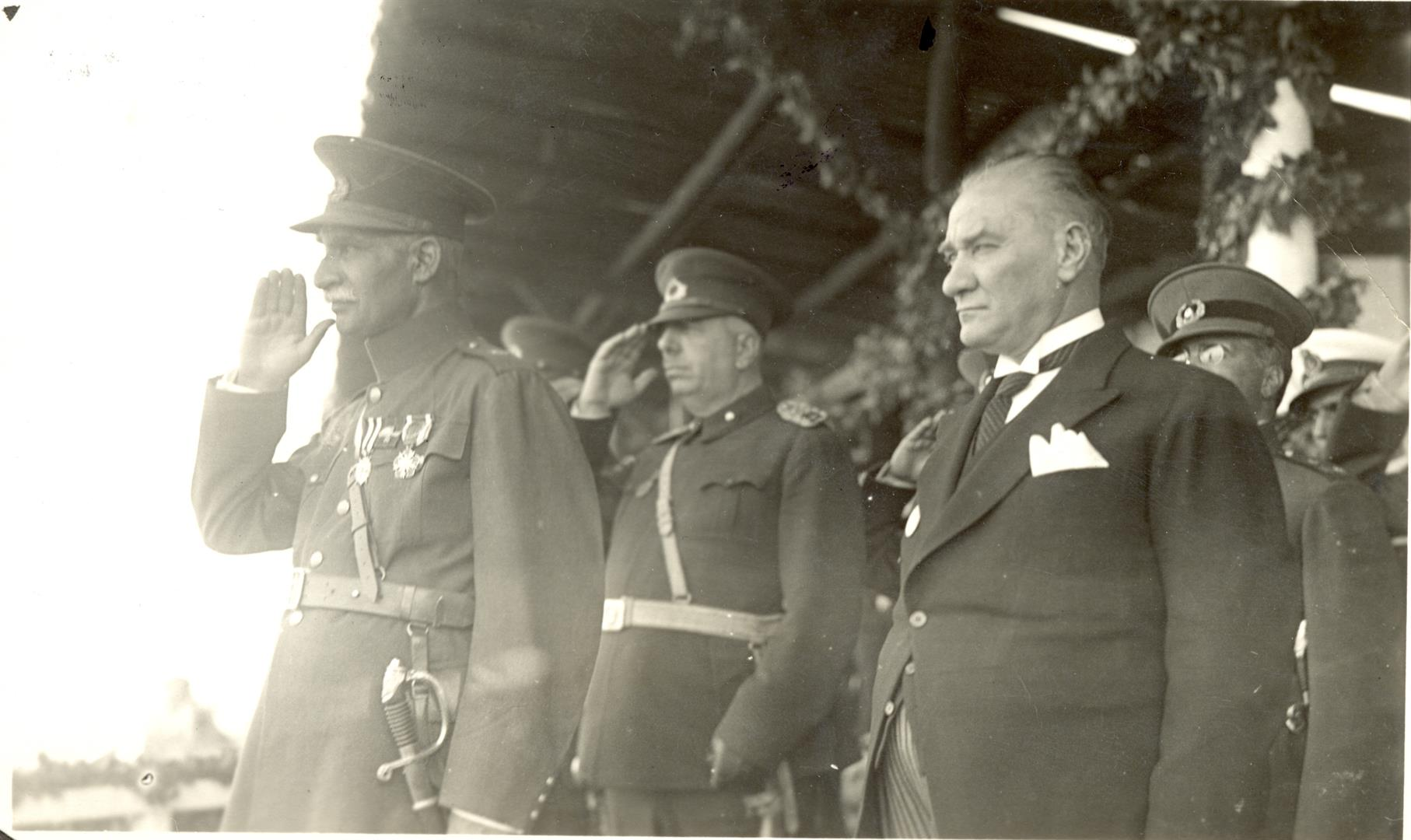
Reza Shah with president Mustafa Kemal Atatürk of Turkey

=== Mohammad Reza Shah ===
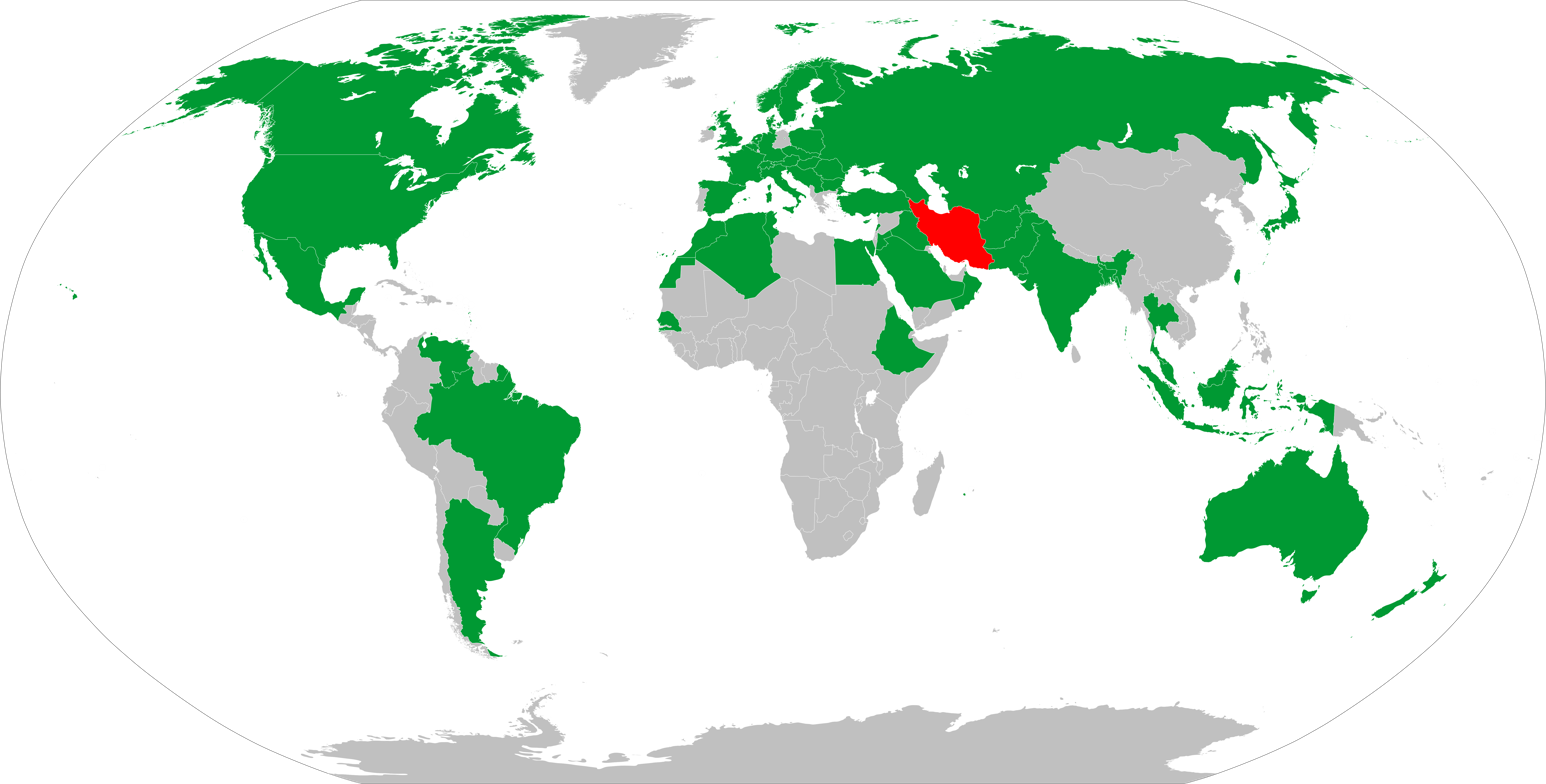
List of state visits made by Mohammad Reza Shah

Date(s)	City and country	Details
1948
17–19 July	Malta	
19–31 July	United Kingdom	invited to 1948 Summer Olympics Opening ceremony by King George VI meeting with King George VI and receiving Royal Victorian Chain
31 July – 6 August	France	meeting with President Vincent Auriol and receiving French War Cross with Palm
6–17 August	Switzerland	meeting with President Enrico Celio
17–25 August	Italy	meeting with President Luigi Einaudi and Prime Minister Alcide De Gasperi, receiving Italian Cross of Merit for War
25–26 August	Cyprus	
1949
15 November – 30 December	United States	meeting with President Harry S. Truman
1950
1–16 March	Pakistan	meeting with Khawaja Nazimuddin Governor-General of Pakistan and Prime Minister Liaquat Ali Khan
4 March	East Pakistan	
1954
5 December	Lebanon	meeting with President Camille Chamoun
6 December 1954 – 10 February 1955	United States	meeting with President Dwight D. Eisenhower
1955
16–23 February	United Kingdom	meeting with Queen Elizabeth II
23 February – 11 March	West Germany	meeting with President Theodor Heuss
11–12 March	Kingdom of Iraq	meeting with King Faisal II
1956
15 February – 7 March	India	meeting with Prime Minister Jawaharlal Nehru
7–9 March	Pakistan	meeting with Prime Minister Muhammad Ali
14–28 May	Turkey	meeting with President Celâl Bayar
24 June – 12 July	Soviet Union	meeting with Kliment Voroshilov Chairman of the Presidium of the Supreme Soviet of the Soviet Union
1957
11–16 March	Saudi Arabia	meeting with King Saud
20–28 May	Francoist Spain	meeting with Francisco Franco Head of State and Caudillo of Spain
1–14 June	France	
14 June – 1 July	Italy	
1–5 July	Switzerland	
5–12 July	France	
16–23 December	Lebanon	
1958
12 May	Pakistan	
14–19 May	Republic of China	meeting with President Chiang Kai-shek
19 May – 1 June	Japan	meeting with Emperor Hirohito, receiving Order of the Chrysanthemum, attended in 1958 Asian Games Opening ceremony
2 June – 10 July	United States	meeting with President Dwight D. Eisenhower
11 July	Italy	
11–14 July	France	
14–17 July	Turkey	meeting with President Celâl Bayar and Pakistani President Iskander Mirza, attended in CENTO Summit
27 November – 2 December	Italy	meeting with President Giovanni Gronchi
30 November	Vatican City	meeting with Pope John XXIII
3 December	Switzerland	
1960
February	Pakistan	
1960	Yugoslavia	
1961
May	Norway	
October	France	meeting with President Charles de Gaulle
April	United States of America	
1964
June	United States of America	
1965
March	United Kingdom	
May	Brazil	
May	Argentina	
May	Canada	
July	Soviet Union	
1966
September	People's Republic of Bulgaria	
September	Hungarian People's Republic	
September	Polish People's Republic	
1967
January	Thailand	
January	Malaysia	
March	Pakistan	
March	West Germany	
March	Czechoslovakia	
June	Turkey	
June	France	
1968
June	Ethiopian Empire	
September	Soviet Union	
1969
January	India	
April	Tunisia	
1970
June	Finland	
July	Socialist Republic of Romania	
December	Soviet Union	
1971
June	Canada	
1972
October	Soviet Union	
October	Socialist Federal Republic of Yugoslavia	
October	Socialist Republic of Romania	
October	Polish People's Republic	
1973
July	United Kingdom	
July	United States of America	
October	France	
1973	Yugoslavia	
1974
September	Australia	
September	New Zealand	
September	Indonesia	
September	India	
1975
January	Egypt	
January	Jordan	
May	Venezuela	
May	Mexico	
May	United States of America	
May	Jordan	
1976
January	United States of America	
February	Spain	
February	Senegal	
March	Pakistan	
April	Pakistan	
April	United Kingdom	
April	United States of America	
1977
1977	United States of America	
1977	Polish People's Republic	
1977	France	
1978
10 January	Saudi Arabia	
19–22 May	Hungary	

== See also ==
- List of international trips made by presidents of Iran
- Foreign relations of Iran
