= Regional Cooperation for Development =

Former intergovernmental organization

Native names
- - Persian: همکاری عمران منطقه‌ای
  - romanised: Hamkārī-ye ʿOmrān-e Mantaghe’ī
  - Turkish: Bölgesel Kalkınma için İşbirliği
  - Urdu: علاقائی تعاون برائے ترقی
  - romanised: Ilāqāʾī Taʿāwun barāʾe Taraqqī
- 1964–1979 (Note: Officially dissolved with the fall of Pahlavi Iran in the Iranian Revolution)
- Member states of the RCD
- Headquarters: Tehran
- Official languages: English
- Member states: Iran; Pakistan; Turkey
- History
  - Established: 21 July 1964
  - Disestablished: 11 February 1979 (Note: Officially dissolved with the fall of Pahlavi Iran in the Iranian Revolution)
Succeeded by
Economic Cooperation Organization

The Regional Cooperation for Development (RCD) or Organization for Regional Cooperation and Development (ORCD) was a multi-governmental organization originally established on July 21, 1964 by Iran, Pakistan and Turkey, regional members of the Central Treaty Organization (CENTO), to promote regional economic cooperation and socioeconomic development. Its headquarters were in Tehran, the capital of Iran. Under this organization, Pakistan, with aid from Iran, was able to build the 813 km long N-25 highway, also known as the RCD highway. Several other developments also took place in the member countries who were able to get and provide financial aid to each other.

In 1979, the RCD was dissolved following the Iranian Revolution. It was replaced by the Economic Cooperation Organization (ECO) in 1985. In 1992, seven new members were added to the ECO: Afghanistan, Azerbaijan, Kazakhstan, Kyrgyzstan, Uzbekistan, Tajikistan and Turkmenistan.

== Joint stamp issues ==
From 1965 to 1979, the three nations jointly issued stamps. These depicted famous leaders of each country, such as the Shah of Iran, Mustafa Kemal Atatürk, and Mohammad Ali Jinnah; arts, buildings, World Heritage Sites including Mohenjo-Daro and landscapes including Lake Saiful Muluk, Kaghan Valley, Pakistan.
