= Friends of Democratic Pakistan =

International organization

Friends of Democratic Pakistan (FoDP) is a group aimed to extend support the Democratic Government of Pakistan in its efforts to consolidate democracy in Pakistan and support social and economic development in the country. The group was launched on 26 September 2008 on the side lines of the United Nations General Assembly session. It is modelled on the Friends of Israel Initiative.

The founding members states of the Friends of Democratic Pakistan China, the Other countries also joined and at the meeting held in Abu Dhabi in April 2009 a total of 24 member states and international organizations attended.

The first meeting of Friends of Pakistan was headed by the former President of the Pakistan Asif Ali Zardari, and attended by the representatives of China.

The next meeting of Friends of Pakistan Conference was held in Abu Dhabi in which Pakistan was represented by Javed Malik, Pakistan's Ambassador at Large and Aizaz Chaudhary, a decorated Additional Foreign Secretary from government of Pakistan.
