= 17th ECO Summit =

Economic Cooperation Organization meeting

2025 ECO Summit
- Host country: Azerbaijan
- Date: 3-4 July 2025
- Cities: Khankendi
- Follows: Tashkent 2023

The 2025 ECO summit is the seventeenth Economic Cooperation Organization summit, held on 3-4 July 2025 in Khankendi, Azerbaijan.

== Attending delegations ==
- Deputy Prime minister Abdul Ghani Baradar – Afghanistan
- President Ilham Aliyev – Azerbaijan
- President Masoud Pezeshkian – Iran
- Prime minister Oljas Bektenov – Kazakhstan
- President Sadyr Japarov – Kyrgyzstan
- Prime minister Shehbaz Sharif – Pakistan
- President Emomali Rahmon – Tajikistan
- President Recep Tayyip Erdoğan – Turkey
- Foreign minister Raşit Meredow – Turkmenistan
- President Shavkat Mirziyoyev – Uzbekistan
- President Ersin Tatar – Northern Cyprus
