= France–Pakistan Atomic Energy Framework =

Bilateral energy treaty

The France–Pakistan atomic energy framework, or also known as France–Pakistan nuclear deal, is a bilateral energy treaty signed by the governments of France and Pakistan on 15 May 2009. The framework of this agreement was a 15 May 2009, in a joint press statement of President Nicolas Sarkozy and President Asif Ali Zardari, under which France agreed to provide assistance to improve the nuclear safety of its nuclear power installations and related civilian nuclear facilities under International Atomic Energy Agency (IAEA) safeguards and, as well as the transfer full civilian-based nuclear technology to Pakistan.

In contrast to Indo-American nuclear agreement, this framework restricted itself to only to co-operate in the field of "nuclear safety", as quoted by the French Foreign Ministry. While foreign service officers and the Foreign minister Shah Mahmood Qureshi outlined what they termed as "significant development"; however, a French official stated that his nation has "no intention" of pursuing a civilian nuclear trade deal, roughly equivalent to Indo-US deal, with Pakistan.

== Overview and background ==
Since 1967, France has emerged as the biggest defence contractor of Pakistan, despite its good and relatively close relations with India. Pakistan is one of three original participant states (others being India and Israel) that refused to be signatory of the NPT. In March 1976, France and Pakistan signed a mutual agreement for the supply of plutonium-based nuclear reprocessing plant at the Chasma. However, this deal came under attack from various countries, particularly the United States, for two reasons. First, Pakistan under Prime minister Zulfikar Ali Bhutto was putting efforts to gain success in its atomic bomb project. Second, the French deal was not completely under the inspection of the International Atomic Energy Agency (IAEA). The United States pressed full scope and built momentum on France to re-consider its decision, while on other hand, Bhutto threatened the France that the future contracts would be contingent on its first fulfilling the "contractual obligation" to the legally obliged agreement. In 1976, Henry Kissinger arrived Pakistan with tough message which became publicly known in Pakistan. In a short span of time, France under pressured by the various countries, cancelled the project with Pakistan.

== Clauses and scope ==
Despite France's willingness to give a green signal for this agreement, the confusion remains over what was agreed. The officials of Pakistan's Foreign ministry had undertaken to supply Pakistan with "civilian nuclear technology", the French officials stressed on the fact that "France had agreed only to co-operate in the field of "nuclear safety". Although, in an official press French President Nicolas Sarkozy marked to his counterpart that "France wanted Pakistan to have a wide-ranging deal to buy nuclear equipment" like the one obtained by its rival India, but later spokesman for the French presidency was careful to rein in expectations and much of the details were closed to the public.

== Notes ==
9.https://www.nytimes.com/1976/08/26/archives/france-to-pursue-nuclear-deal-with-pakistan-fought-by-us.html France-Pakistan Nuclear Talks
