= Economic Cooperation Organization =

Asian political and economic intergovernmental organization

(in other official languages)
Azerbaijani	İqtisadi Əməkdaşlıq Təşkilatı
Persian	سازمان همکاری اقتصادی
Kazakh	Экономикалық Ынтымақтастық Ұйымы; Ekonomikalyq Yntymaqtastyq Ūiymy
Kyrgyz	Экономикалык Кызматташтык Уюму
Pashto	د اقتصادي او همکاريو سازمان
Tajik	Ташкилоти ҳамкории иқтисодӣ
Turkmen	Ykdysady Hyzmatdaşlyk Guramasy
Turkish	Ekonomik İşbirliği Teşkilatı
Urdu	اقتصادی تعاون تنظیم
Uzbek	Iqtisodiy Hamkorlik Tashkiloti
- Logo
- Motto: "Sustainable socioeconomic development for the people of the region"
- Member states of the ECO
- Headquarters: Tehran, Iran
- Largest metropolis: Karachi
- Official languages: English
- Member states: 10 members: Afghanistan; Azerbaijan; Iran; Kazakhstan; Kyrgyzstan; Pakistan; Tajikistan; Turkey; Turkmenistan; Uzbekistan; 1 observer: Northern Cyprus

Leaders
  - Secretary General: Asad Majeed Khan

Area
  - Total: 8,208,600 km^{2} (3,169,400 sq mi)

Population
  - 2023 estimate: ▲580,819,813 (3rd)
  - Density: 70.7/km^{2} (183.1/sq mi)
- GDP (PPP): 2026 estimate
  - Total: ▲$9.84 trillion (4th)
  - Per capita: ▲$16,947
- GDP (nominal): 2023 estimate
  - Total: ▲$3.16 trillion (8th)
  - Per capita: ▲$5,440
- HDI (2023): 0.663 medium (137th)
- Currency: 10 currencies: (Afghanistan) Afghani (AFN); (Turkey) Lira (TRY); (Azerbaijan) Manat (AZN); (Turkmenistan) Manat (TMT); (Iran) Rial (IRR); (Pakistan) Rupee (PKR); (Kyrgyzstan) Som (KGS); (Uzbekistan) Soum (UZS); (Tajikistan) Somoni (TJS); (Kazakhstan) Tenge (KZT)
- Time zone: UTC+2 to +5
- Calling code: 10 codes: (Kazakhstan) +7; (Turkey) +90; (Pakistan) +92; (Afghanistan) +93; (Iran) +98; (Tajikistan) +992; (Turkmenistan) +993; (Azerbaijan) +994; (Kyrgyzstan) +996; (Uzbekistan) +998
- Website www.eco.int
Preceded by
Regional Cooperation for Development

The Economic Cooperation Organization or ECO is a Eurasian political and economic intergovernmental organization that was founded in 1985 in Tehran by the leaders of Iran, Pakistan, and Turkey. It provides a platform to discuss ways to improve development and promote trade and investment opportunities. The ECO is an ad hoc organisation under the United Nations Charter. The objective is to establish a single market for goods and services, much like the European Union. After the dissolution of the Soviet Union, the ECO expanded to include Afghanistan, Azerbaijan, Kazakhstan, Kyrgyzstan, Tajikistan, Turkmenistan, and Uzbekistan in 1992.

The current framework of the ECO expresses itself mostly in the form of bilateral agreements and arbitration mechanisms between individual and fully sovereign member states. Similar to ASEAN, the ECO maintains dedicated secretariats and administrative bodies to coordinate trade among its member states. Regional initiatives include cross-border agricultural collaboration across the historically integrated Fergana Valley between Kyrgyzstan, Tajikistan, and Uzbekistan, as well as multimodal transit via the Ashgabat Agreement and the Afghanistan–Pakistan Transit Trade Agreement. Bilateral initiatives also focus on regional energy corridors, including the Tabriz–Ankara pipeline and proposed projects such as the TAPI and Iran–Pakistan gas pipeline, intended to move Central Asian energy to industrial hubs across Iran, Pakistan, and Turkey.

The ECO's Secretariat and ECO Cultural Institute are based in Iran, the ECO Trade and Development Bank and ECO Educational Institute are located in Turkey, and the ECO Science Foundation is in Pakistan.

== History ==
The Economic Cooperation Organization was the successor organisation of what was the Regional Cooperation for Development (RCD), founded in 1964, which ended activities in 1979. In 1985, Iran, Pakistan and Turkey joined to form the ECO.

By late 1992, the ECO expanded to include seven new member states: Afghanistan, Azerbaijan, Kazakhstan, Kyrgyzstan, Tajikistan, Turkmenistan, and Uzbekistan. The date of this expansion, 28 November, is recognized as "ECO Day". The organization continues to address structural challenges, primarily the need to modernize infrastructure and regulatory institutions to utilize regional resources and facilitate sustainable economic growth.

The Economic Cooperation Organisation Trade Agreement (ECOTA) was signed on 17 July 2003 in Islamabad. The ECO Trade Promotion Organization (TPO) was established in Iran in 2009 to promote intra-regional commerce, with member states initially targeting the establishment of a common trade market by 2015.

== Official names ==
The official working language of the Economic Cooperation Organization is English. The official names of the organization are:

- Azerbaijani: İqtisadi Əməkdaşlıq Təşkilatı
- Kazakh: Экономикалық ынтымақтастық ұйымы, romanized: Ekonomikalyq yntymaqtastyq ūiymy
- Kyrgyz: Экономикалык Кызматташтык Уюму, romanized: Ekonomikalyk Kyzmattashtyk Uyumu
- Pashto: د اقتصادي همکاريو سازمان, romanized: Da Iqtesadi Valamkariano Sazman
- Persian: سازمان همکاری اقتصادی, romanized: Sāzmān-e Hamkāri-ye Eqtesādi
- Russian: Организация экономического сотрудничества, romanized: Organizatsiya ekonomicheskogo sotrudnichestva
- Tajik: Созмони Ҳамкории Иқтисодӣ, romanized: Sozmoni Khamkorii Iktisody
- Turkish: Ekonomik İşbirliği Teşkilatı
- Turkmen: Ykdysady Hyzmatdaşlyk Guramasy
- Urdu: اقتصادی تعاون تنظیم, romanized: Iqtiṣādī Taʿāvan Tanẓīm
- Uzbek: Iqtisodiy Hamkorlik Tashkiloti / Iktisodiy Khamkorlik Tashkiloti

== Objectives and principles ==
=== Objectives ===
- Sustainable economic development of member states
- Progressive removal of trade barriers and promotion of intra-regional trade
- Integration of the ECO region's economy into global markets
- Development of transport and communications infrastructure connecting member states with one another and global transit corridors
- Economic liberalization and privatization
- Mobilization and utilization of regional natural, agricultural, and industrial resources
- Regional cooperation in environmental protection, drug abuse control, and cultural exchange
- Beneficial cooperation with regional and international organizations

=== Principles ===
- Sovereign equality of member states and mutual benefit
- Alignment of national development plans with regional ECO objectives
- Joint initiatives to expand access to international markets for member states' raw materials and manufactured products
- Common coordination toward regional and multilateral economic agreements

== Membership ==
=== Full members ===
Name	Population (2023, millions)	Area	Population density	GDP (2023, nominal, US$ billions)	GDP per capita (2023, nominal, US$)	GDP (2023, PPP, Int$ billions)	GDP per capita (2023, PPP, Int$)
Afghanistan	32.2 million	652,230 km^{2} (251,830 sq mi)	55.23/km^{2} (143.0/sq mi)	14.467	422.229	72.512	2,116.334
Azerbaijan	10.1 million	86,600 km^{2} (33,400 sq mi)	114.78/km^{2} (297.3/sq mi)	76.639	7,525.428	189.273	18,585.191
Iran	88.3 million	1,648,195 km^{2} (636,372 sq mi)	49.97/km^{2} (129.4/sq mi)	403.526	4,662.520	1,752.856	20,253.297
Kazakhstan	22.4 million	2,724,900 km^{2} (1,052,100 sq mi)	6.78/km^{2} (17.6/sq mi)	260.510	13,116.815	656.669	33,063.603
Kyrgyzstan	6.8 million	199,951 km^{2} (77,202 sq mi)	31.95/km^{2} (82.8/sq mi)	12.775	1,843.190	44.925	6,481.606
Pakistan	231.5 million	881,913 km^{2} (340,509 sq mi)	257.4/km^{2} (667/sq mi)	338.237	1,460.740	1,572.439	6,790.873
Tajikistan	9.7 million	144,100 km^{2} (55,600 sq mi)	63.20/km^{2} (163.7/sq mi)	11.855	1,183.908	54.497	5,442.597
Turkey	83.2 million	783,562 km^{2} (302,535 sq mi)	104.48/km^{2} (270.6/sq mi)	1,108.453	12,849.005	3,628.742	42,063.743
Turkmenistan	7.1 million	488,100 km^{2} (188,500 sq mi)	11.82/km^{2} (30.6/sq mi)	77.106	11,833.107	124.257	19,069.183
Uzbekistan	35.5 million	447,400 km^{2} (172,700 sq mi)	72.99/km^{2} (189.0/sq mi)	90.882	2,522.757	372.987	10,353.579
10 total	566.8 million	7,971,133 km^{2} (3,077,672 sq mi)	60.66/km^{2} (157.1/sq mi)	2.61 trillion	3,726.922	8.83 trillion	12,990.954

=== Observers ===
- Northern Cyprus
- Organization of Turkic States
- International Energy Charter

== Structure ==
=== Council of Ministers ===
The Council of Ministers (COM) is the highest policy and decision-making body and is composed of the various Ministers of Foreign Affairs or such other representatives of the ministerial rank as may be designated by the respective governments. The COM meets at least once a year by rotation among the member states.

=== Council of Permanent Representatives ===
The Council of Permanent Representatives (CPR) consists of the Permanent Representatives/Ambassadors of the member states accredited to the Islamic Republic of Iran as well as to the ECO and the Director-General for ECO Affairs of the Ministry of Foreign Affairs of the Islamic Republic of Iran.

=== Regional Planning Council ===
The Regional Planning Council (RPC) is composed of the Heads of the Planning Organizations of member states or other representatives of corresponding authorities.

=== ECO Secretariat ===
The ECO Secretariat consists of six directorates and six sections in the ECO Secretariat staffed by professionals working in the relevant areas of regional economic cooperation. Each directorate is headed by a director while each section is run by a head of section. There are also several programme officers and research officers working in each directorate of the Secretariat.

- Directorate of Trade and Investment (DTI)
- Directorate of Transport and Communications (DTC)
- Directorate of Energy, Minerals, and Environment (DEME)
- Directorate of Tourism (DT)
- Directorate of Agriculture and Industry (DAI)
- Directorate of Human Resources and Sustainable Development (DHRSD)

== Activities ==
Activities of ECO are conducted through directorates under the supervision of the Secretary-General and his Deputies which consider and evolve projects and programs of mutual benefit in the fields of:

- Trade and Investment
- Transport and Communications
- Energy, Minerals and Environment
- Agriculture and Industry
- Tourism
- Human Resources & Sustainable

== Summits and general secretaries ==
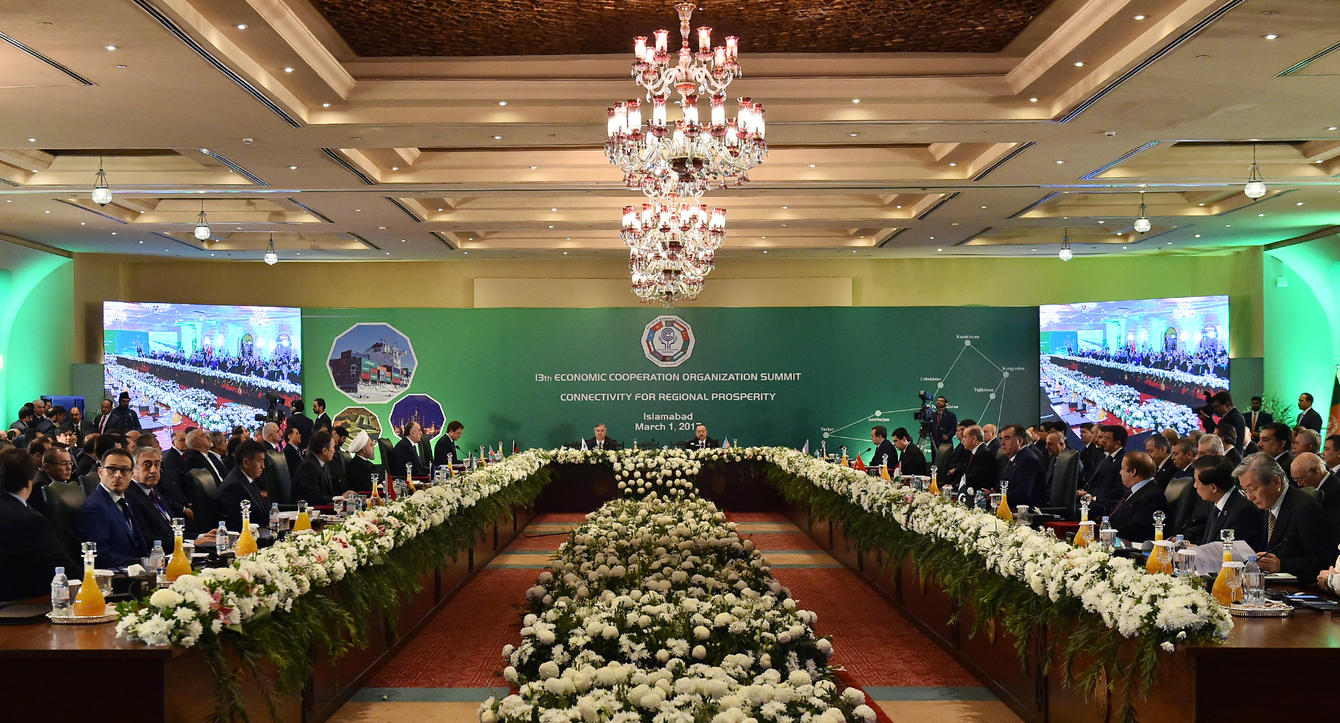
World leaders gathering for the 13th ECO Summit

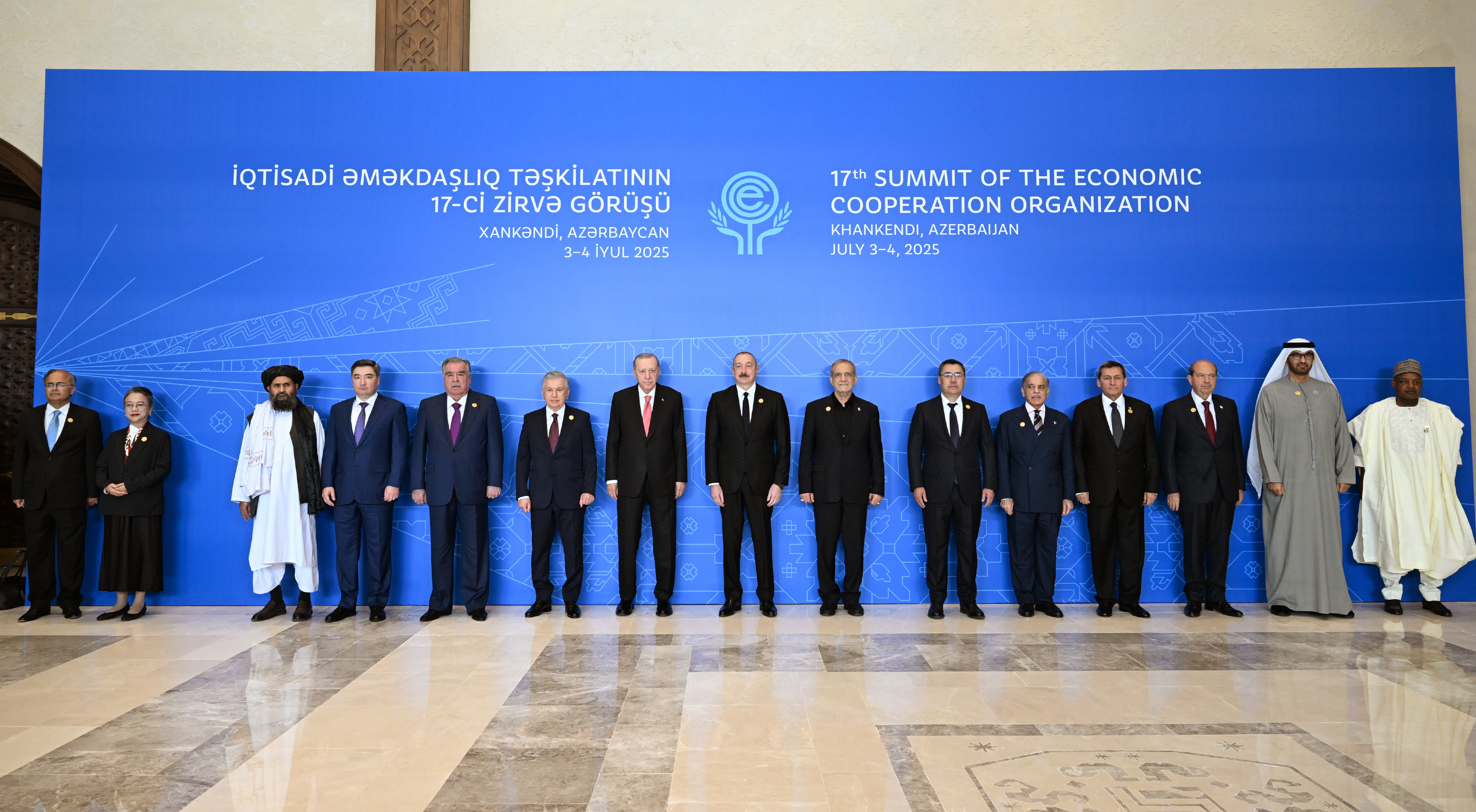
Group photo at the 17th ECO Summit in Khankendi, Azerbaijan, 4 July 2025

=== Heads of State summits ===
Meeting	Date(s)	Country	Location
1st	16–17 February 1992	Iran	Tehran
2nd	6–7 May 1993	Turkey	Istanbul
3rd	14-15 May 1995	Pakistan	Islamabad
4th	14 May 1996	Turkmenistan	Ashgabat
5th	11 May 1998	Kazakhstan	Almaty
6th	10 June 2000	Iran	Tehran
7th	14 October 2002	Turkey	Istanbul
8th	14 September 2004	Tajikistan	Dushanbe
9th	5 May 2006	Azerbaijan	Baku
10th	11 March 2009	Iran	Tehran
11th	23 December 2010	Turkey	Istanbul
12th	16 October 2012	Azerbaijan	Baku
13th	1 March 2017	Pakistan	Islamabad
14th	4 March 2021	Turkey	Ankara
15th	28 November 2021	Turkmenistan	Ashgabat
16th	8–9 November 2023	Uzbekistan	Tashkent
17th	3–4 July 2025	Azerbaijan	Khankendi
18th	2027	Iran	TBA

=== List of general secretaries ===
No.	Name	Nationality	Period
1	Alireza Salari	Iran	August 1988 – July 1992
2	Shamshad Ahmad	Pakistan	August 1992 – July 1996
3	Önder Özar	Turkey	August 1996 – July 2000
4	Abdolrahim Gavahi	Iran	August 2000 – July 2002
5	Seyed Mojtaba Arastou	Iran	August 2002 – July 2003
6	Bekzhassar Narbayev	Kazakhstan	August 2003 – January 2004
7	Askhat Orazbay	Kazakhstan	February 2004 – July 2006
8	Khurshid Anwar	Pakistan	August 2006 – July 2009
9	Yahya Maroofi	Afghanistan	August 2009 – July 2012
10	Shamil Alaskerov	Azerbaijan	August 2012 – July 2015
11	Halil Ibrahim Akca	Turkey	August 2015 – July 2018
12	Hadi Soleimanpour	Iran	August 2018 – 2021
13	Khusrav Noziri	Tajikistan	August 2021 – 2024
14	Asad Majeed Khan	Pakistan	August 2024 –
source		ECO Secretaries General	

== Regional Institutions & Agencies ==
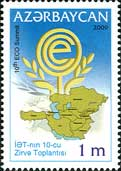
Azerbaijani stamp celebrating the 10th ECO summit in Azerbaijan.

=== ECO Chamber of Commerce and Industry ===
ECO-CCI was established on 10 June 1993. Its objectives are to contribute to enhancing economic cooperation and relations in trade, industry, agriculture, tourism, contracting, engineering and banking sectors as well as to realize joint investments among the Member States. National Chambers of Afghanistan, Azerbaijan, Iran, Kazakhstan, Kyrgyzstan, Pakistan, Tajikistan, and Turkey are members of ECO-CCI. The 7th General Assembly Meeting of ECO Chamber of Commerce and Industry (ECO-CCI) was held on 20 April 2004 in Kabul, Afghanistan. The participating member states offered some proposals for developing new mechanisms and modalities for better interaction between member chambers and to re-activate ECO-CCI.

=== ECO Reinsurance Company ===
In March 1995, Iran, Pakistan, and Turkey agreed to establish ECO Reinsurance Company. The purpose is to supplement the existing reinsurance services in the region, promote the growth of the national underwriting and retention capacities, minimize the outflow of foreign exchange from the region, and support economic development in the region. The three-member countries decided to form a Trilateral Interim Committee to pave the way for the establishment of this important institution. The Trilateral Interim Committee, in its various meetings, reviewed the relevant issues such as the development of the business plan and signing of the Articles of Agreement already finalized by a group of Experts from the three founding member countries.

=== ECO Consultancy & Engineering Company ===
Governments of all the ECO Member States have established a central resource pool in the shape of ECO Consultancy and Engineering Company (Pvt.) Ltd., or ECO-CEC, to assist in the development projects sponsored by the ECO Member States or by its Trade and Development Bank. The founding States are the Islamic Republic of Iran, the Islamic Republic of Pakistan, and the Republic of Turkey which holds an equal share in ECO-CEC, Turkey being represented by two companies and Iran and Pakistan, by one each. The Iranian and Turkish Companies specialize mainly in oil and gas pipelines, refineries, petrochemical and industrial engineering, while the Pakistani partner operates in all other fields of development engineering, including communications, power, urban development public health, telecommunications, water resources development and agriculture. ECO-CEC provides its expertise in the entire range of consultancy operations, starting from conception, project planning and appraisal, through pre-feasibility, feasibility and financial studies, investigation and exploration, site selection to engineering design, material and equipment specifications, construction supervision, contract management, quality control and preparation of technical manuals for the operation and maintenance of the projects.

=== ECO Trade and Development Bank ===
The Economic Cooperation Organization Trade and Development Bank (ETDB) was established in August 2005, following the ratification of its Articles of Agreement signed in March 1995 by the three founding members of ECO, the Islamic Republic of Iran, the Islamic Republic of Pakistan, and the Republic of Turkey. The ETDB became fully operational in November 2008, and was joined by Afghanistan in 2012, Azerbaijan in 2013, and the Kyrgyz Republic in 2015. Its headquarters are in Istanbul (Turkey), and representative offices are in Karachi (Pakistan) and Tehran (Iran). The primary objective of the Bank is to provide financial resources for projects and programmes in member countries. The Bank offers a range of medium-to-long-term products, i.e., project finance, corporate finance, trade finance, and loans to support small and medium-sized enterprises directly or through financial intermediaries to private and state-owned entities. As of 2023, the paid-in capital of the ETDB stood at SDR 326,750 thousand, while its authorised capital was of SDR 1,089,100 thousand.

=== ECO Cultural Institute (ECI) ===
ECO Cultural Institute (ECI) is affiliated with ECO and aims at fostering understanding and the preservation of the rich cultural heritage of its members through common projects in the fields of media, literature, art, philosophy, sport and education.

=== Others ===
- ECO Clean Energy Centre (CECECO)
- ECO College of Insurance
- ECO Educational Institute
- ECO Postal Staff College
- ECO Regional Center for Risk Management of Natural Disasters
- ECO Regional Coordination Centre for Food Security
- ECO Regional Institute for Standardization, Conformity Assessment, Accreditation and Metrology (RISCAM)
- ECO Science Foundation
- ECO Seed Association (ECOSA)
- ECO Supreme Audit Institutions

== Relationship with other organizations ==
All the ECO states are also member-states of the Organisation of the Islamic Cooperation (OIC), while ECO itself has observer status in the OIC since 1995.

A clickable Euler diagram showing the relationships between various multinational organisations within the Organisation of Islamic Cooperation

== Leaders of ECO member states ==
Leaders are the constitutional chief executive of the nation's government.

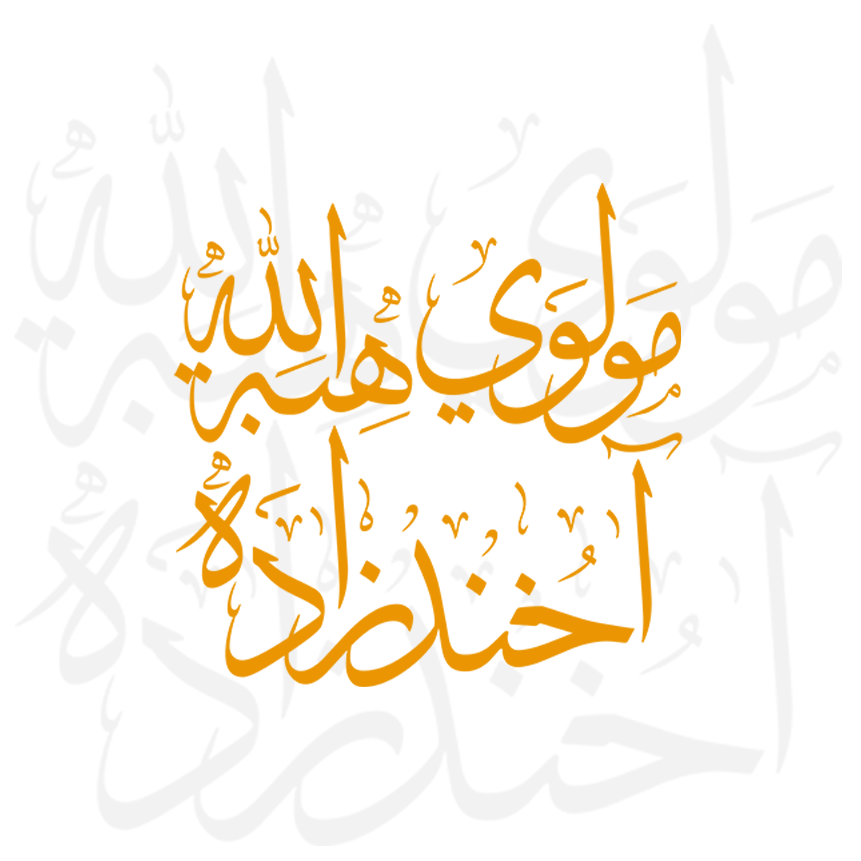
Afghanistan
Hibatullah Akhundzada
Supreme Leader of Afghanistan
(de facto)

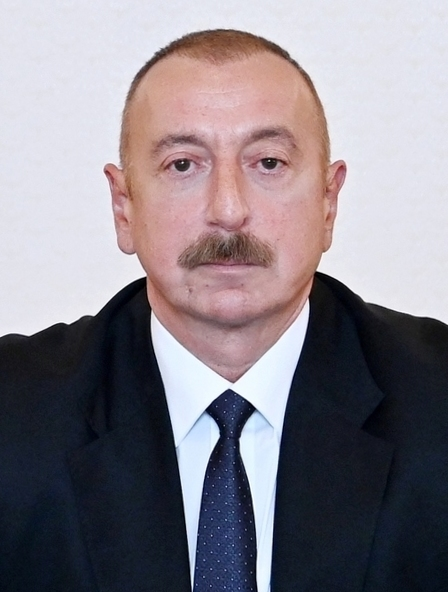
Republic of Azerbaijan
Ilham Aliyev
President of Azerbaijan

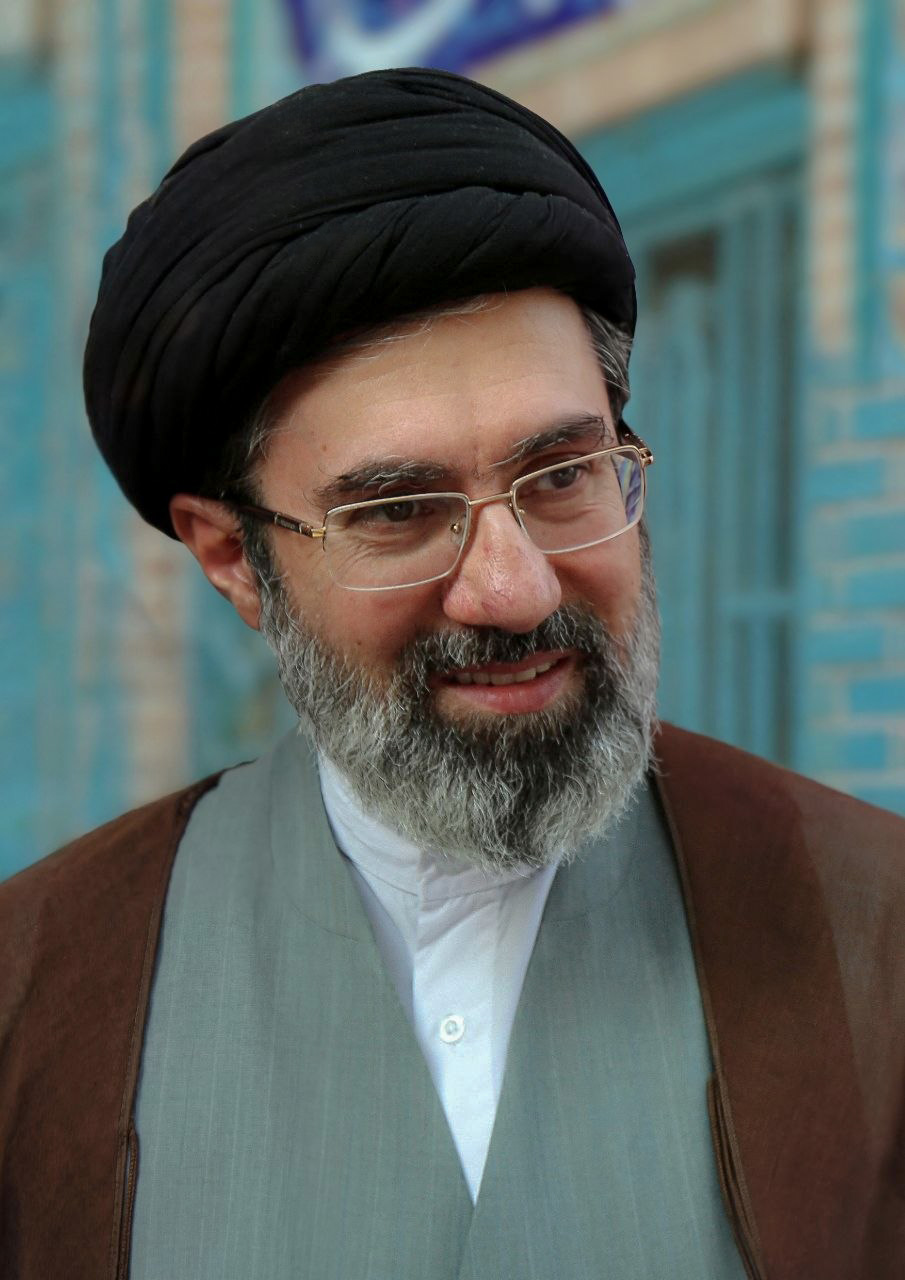
Islamic Republic of Iran
Mojtaba Khamenei
Supreme Leader of Iran

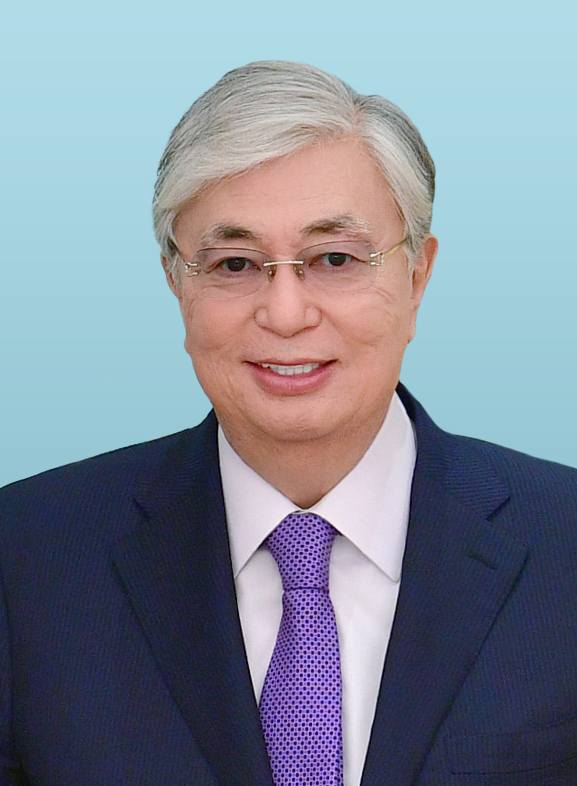
Republic of Kazakhstan
Kassym-Jomart Tokayev
President of Kazakhstan

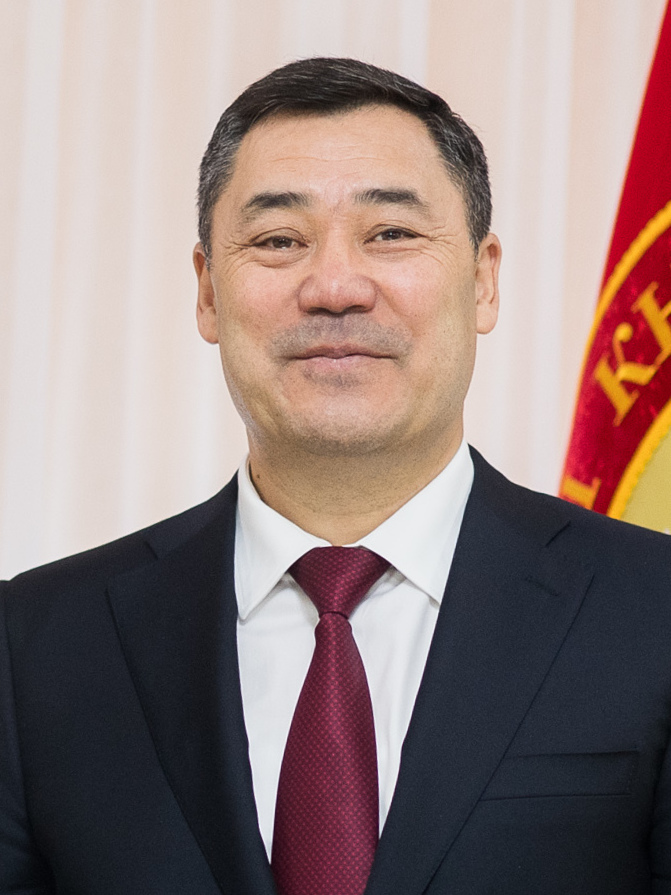
Kyrgyz Republic
Sadyr Japarov
President of Kyrgyzstan

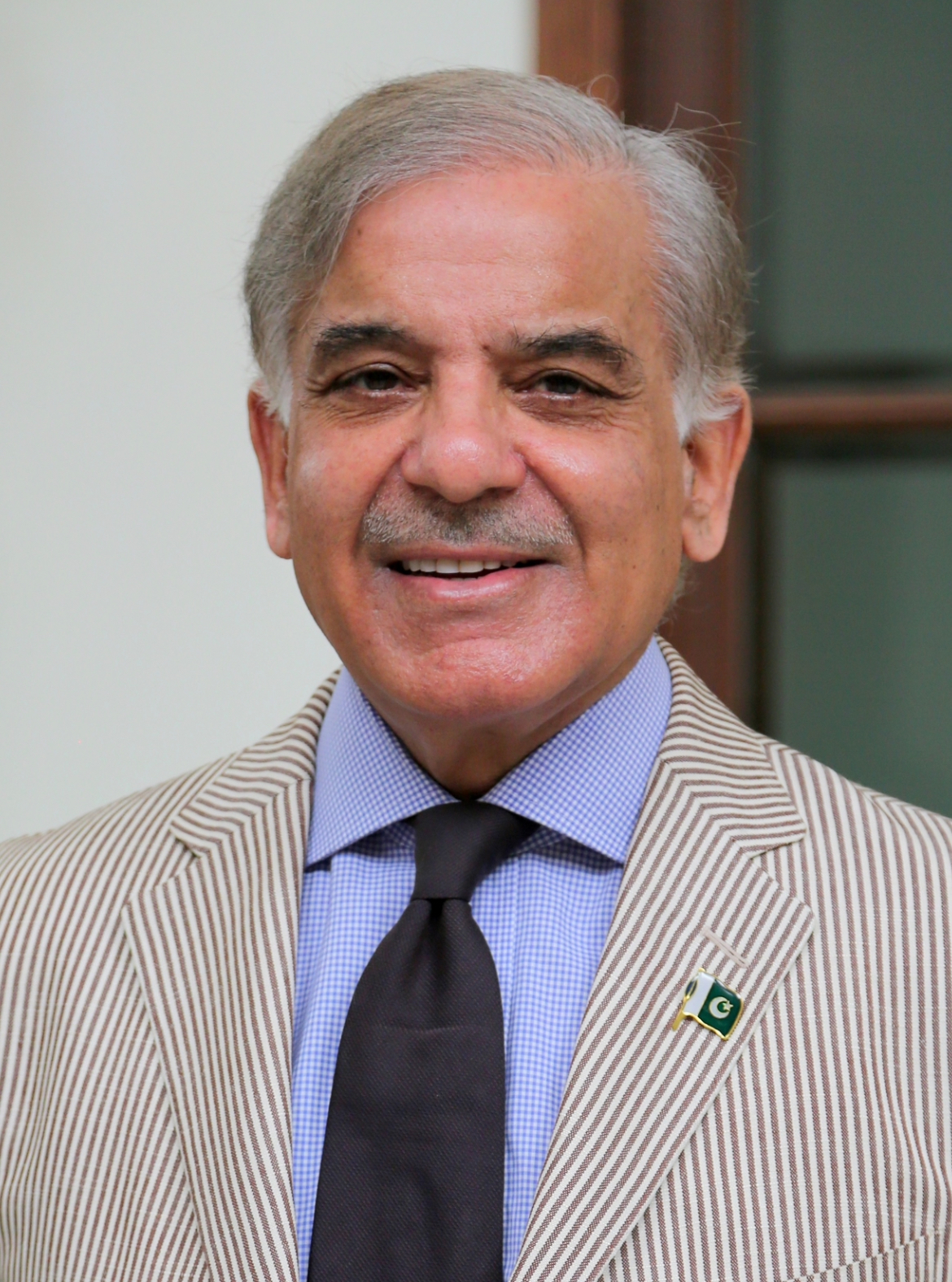
Islamic Republic of Pakistan
Shehbaz Sharif
Prime Minister of Pakistan

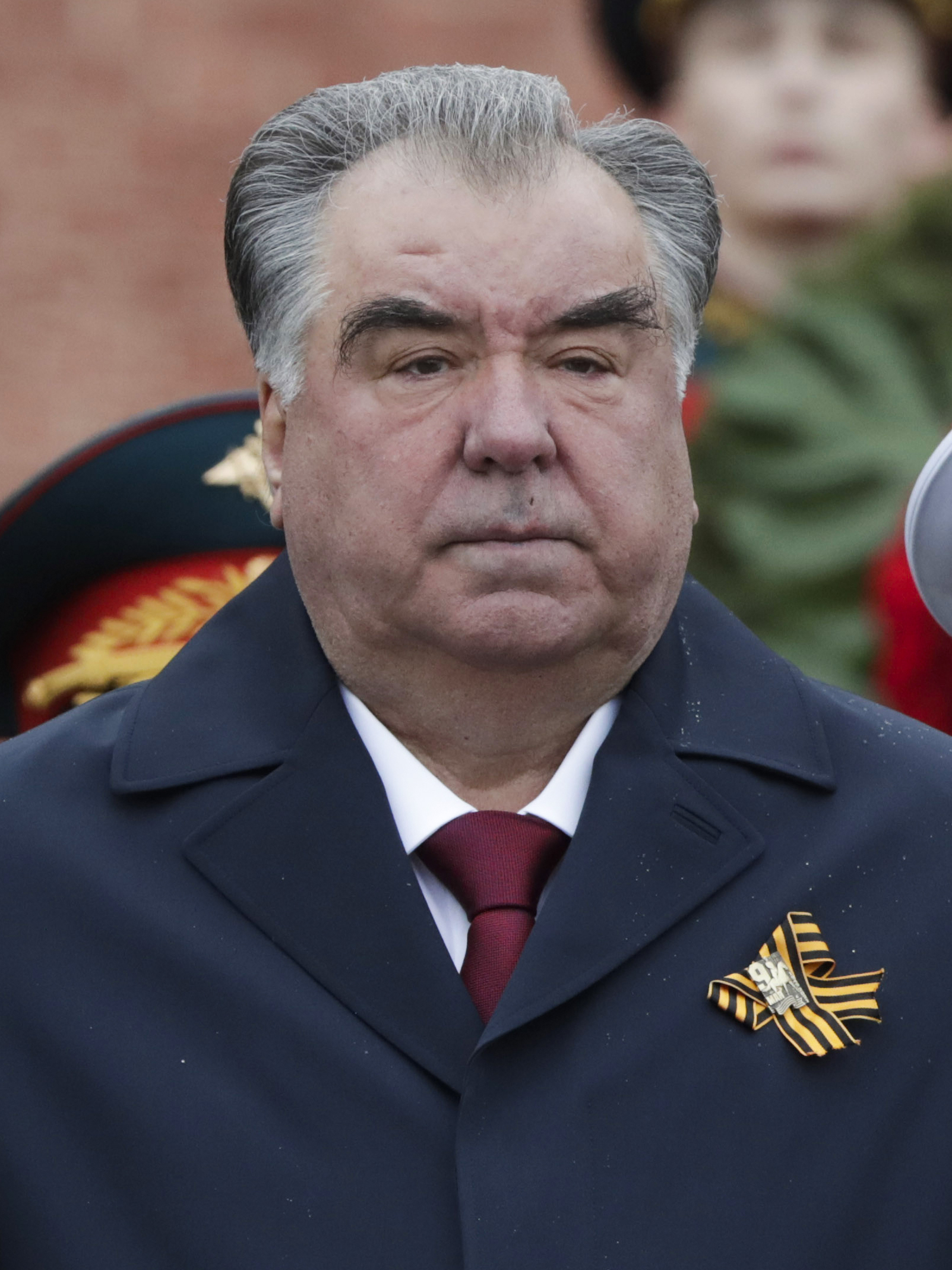
Republic of Tajikistan
Emomali Rahmon
President of Tajikistan

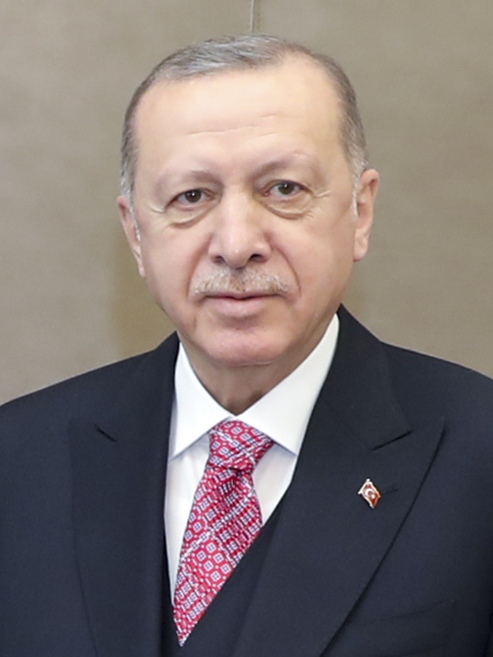
Republic of Turkey
Recep Tayyip Erdoğan
President of Turkey

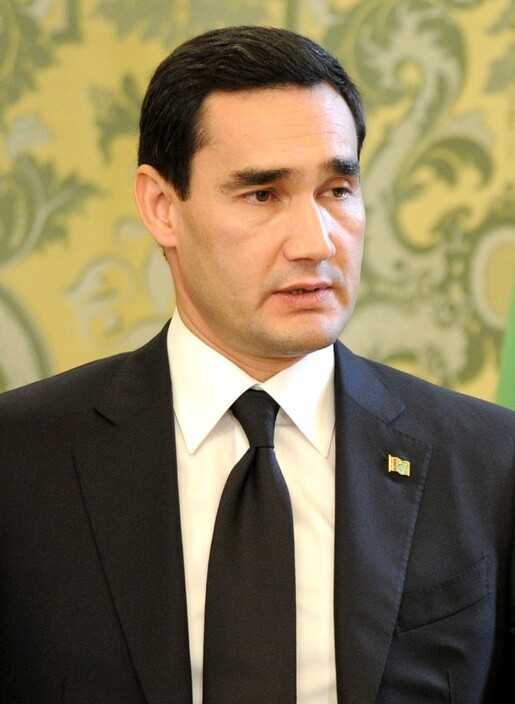
Turkmenistan
Serdar Berdimuhamedow
President of Turkmenistan

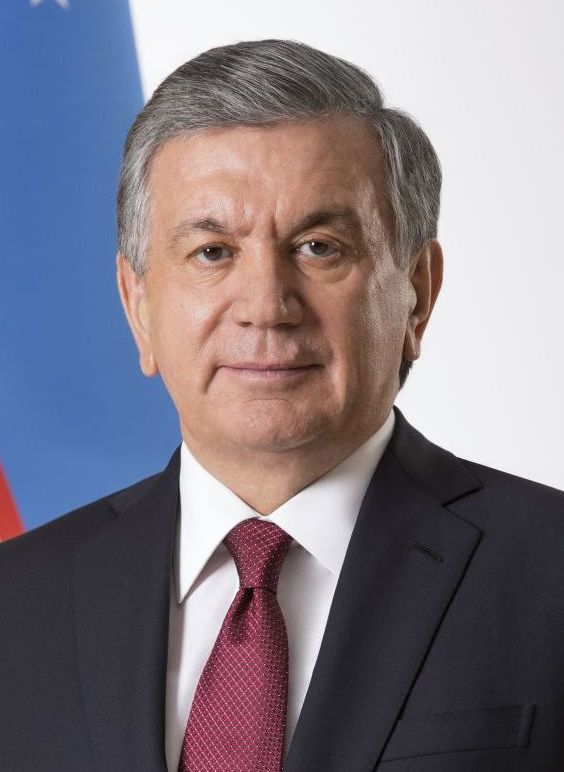
Republic of Uzbekistan
Shavkat Mirziyoyev
President of Uzbekistan

== See also ==
- Gül Train
- Shanghai Cooperation Organisation
- South Asian Association for Regional Cooperation
- Middle East economic integration
- White card system
- Turko-Iranian tradition
- List of country groupings
- List of multilateral free-trade agreements
