= 12th ECO Summit =

2012 ECO Summit
- Host country: Azerbaijan
- Date: 16 October 2012
- Cities: Baku
- Follows: Istanbul 2010
- Precedes: Islamabad 2017

The 2012 ECO summit was the twelfth Economic Cooperation Organization summit, held on 16 October 2012 in Baku, Azerbaijan.

== Attending delegations ==
- President Hamid Karzai – Afghanistan
- President Ilham Aliyev – Azerbaijan
- President Mahmoud Ahmadinejad – Iran
- President Nursultan Nazarbayev – Kazakhstan
- President Almazbek Atambayev – Kyrgyzstan
- President Asif Ali Zardari – Pakistan
- President Emomali Rahmon – Tajikistan
- Prime Minister Recep Tayyip Erdoğan – Turkey
- President Gurbanguly Berdimuhamedow – Turkmenistan
- President Islam Karimov – Uzbekistan
