= List of international presidential trips made by Hassan Rouhani =

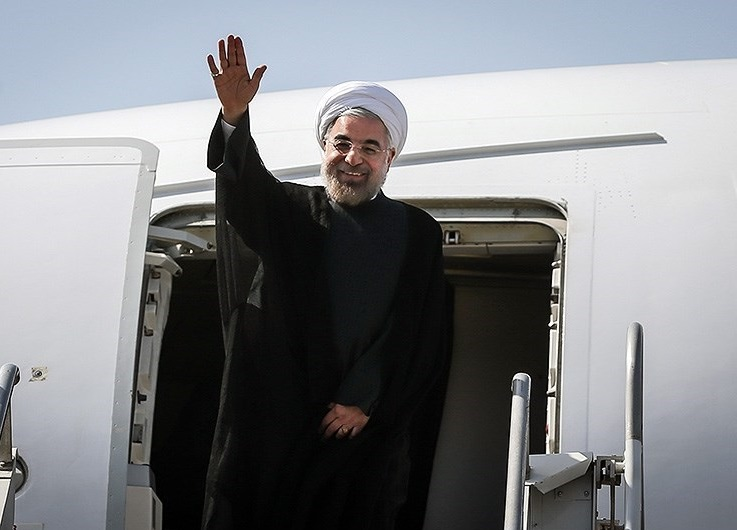
President Rouhani in Mehrabad Airport, leaving Tehran for New York City.

This is a list of international presidential trips made by Hassan Rouhani, the 7th president of Iran

== Summary of international trips ==
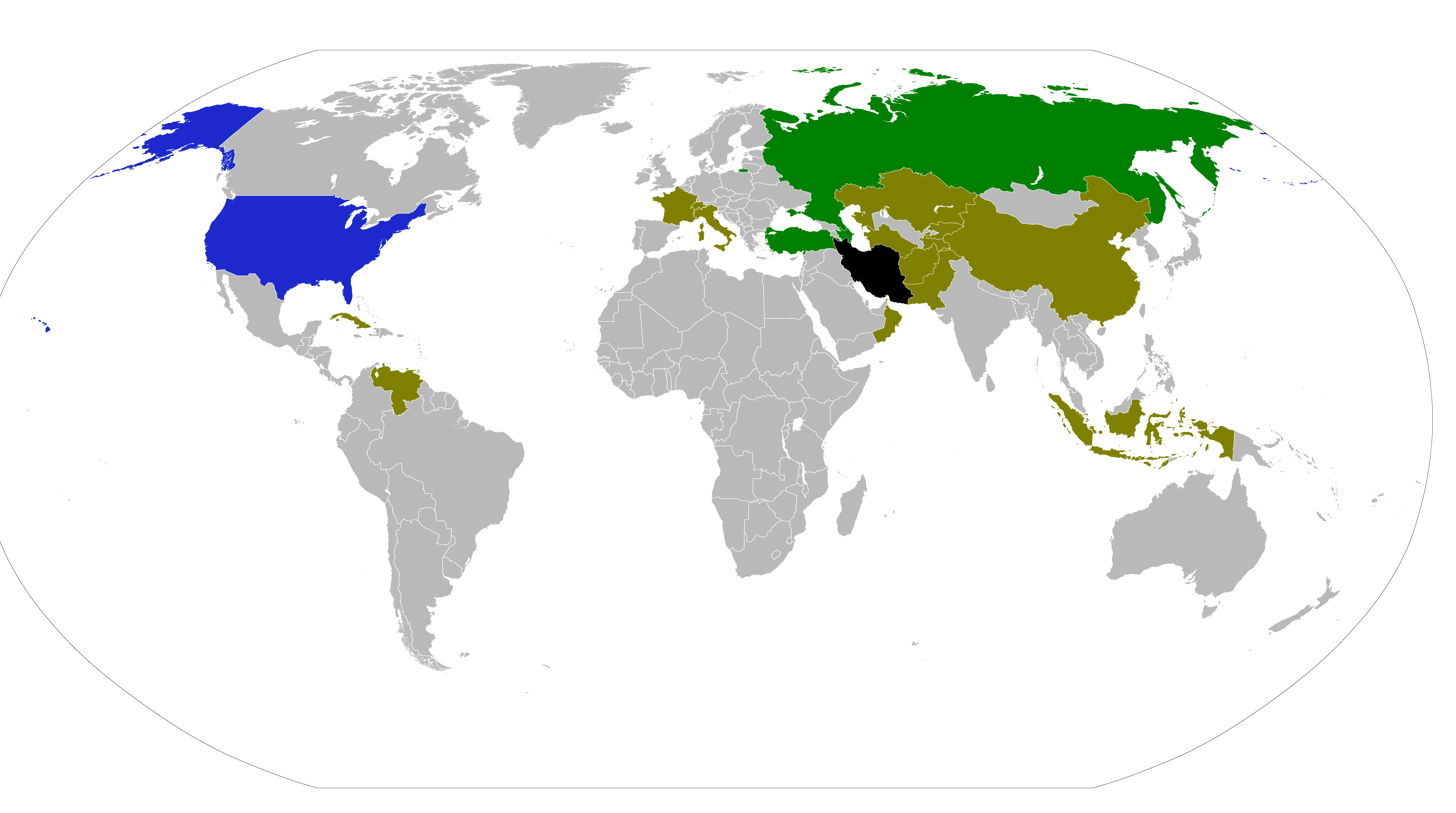
Map of international trips made by Hassan Rouhani as president: 1 visit 2 visits 3 visits 4 visits 5 visits Iran

== 2013 ==
The following international trips were made by President Hassan Rouhani in 2013:

Country	Areas visited	Date(s)	Notes
Kyrgyzstan	Bishkek	September 12–13	Further information: Iran-Kyrgyzstan relations President Rouhani's state visit to Kyrgyzstan was his first trip outside Iran as president. He attended Shanghai Cooperation Organisation head of states summit on 13 September 2013. He chaired the summit as the second spokesperson after Kyrgyzstan's Almazbek Atambayev. He said that he deems disarmament and nuclear non-proliferation necessary for international peace and stability, reiterating that Tehran is committed to the Non-proliferation Treaty (NPT) based on its "legal commitments, religious and moral tenets and strategic considerations." He called for political will, mutual respect, and confidence-building measures to resolve the West's nuclear dispute with Iran. He said that the Islamic Republic insists on the "inalienable right of all NPT member states to enjoy peaceful nuclear technology." Rouhani also said Russia's plan for placing the Syrian chemical weapons under international control and Syria's response to the proposed plan inspire hope for avoiding war. He also met with Almazbek Atambayev of Kyrgyzstan, Vladimir Putin of Russia, Hamid Karzai of Afghanistan, Emomali Rahmon of Tajikistan, Xi Jinping of People's Republic of China, Tsakhiagiin Elbegdorj of Mongolia, Nursultan Nazarbayev of Kazakhstan and Salman Khurshid of India
United Nations	New York City	September 23–28	Further information: Iran-United States relations Rouhani visited United States to attend Sixty-eighth session of the United Nations General Assembly. He addressed the assembly on the afternoon of 24 September 2013. He also spoke at the Treaty on the Non-Proliferation of Nuclear Weapons and Non-Aligned Movement's foreign ministers meeting. He met with French president Francois Hollande, Turkish President Abdullah Gul, Tunisian president Moncef Marzouki, Austrian president Heinz Fischer, Lebanese president Michel Suleiman, Iraqi vice president Khodair al-Khozaei, Italian prime minister Enrico Letta, Spanish prime minister Mariano Rajoy Japanese prime minister Shinzo Abe, Pakistani prime minister Nawaz Sharif, Fijian prime minister Frank Bainimarama, German Foreign Minister Guido Westerwelle, United Nations Secretary General Ban Ki-moon, Organisation of Islamic Cooperation Secretary General Ekmeleddin İhsanoğlu, European Council president Herman Van Rompuy United Nations' Special Envoy on Syria Lakhdar Brahimi and International Monetary Fund Chief Christine Lagarde. White House indicated that President Barack Obama could meet Rouhani in an unofficial meeting but that didn't occur. White House later published a statement announcing that President Rouhani has rejected Obama's invitation for a face-to-face meeting. Rouhani was later interviewed with CNN during which he welcomed the possibility of relations with the United States. He was also invited and spoke at Council on Foreign Relations.

== 2014 ==
The following international trips were made by President Hassan Rouhani in 2014:

Country	Areas visited	Date(s)	Notes
Switzerland	Davos	January 22–24	Further information: Iran-Switzerland relations President Rouhani marked his first European visit to Switzerland. Rouhani addressed at the 44th World Economic Forum. Rouhani is due to meet with a number of leaders of the participating states. President Rouhani will also attend interviews with international news networks and media. President Hassan Rouhani, met with his Swiss counterpart and Member of the Swiss Federal Council Didier Burkhalter, discussed issues of mutual interest and global problems. President Hassan Rouhani met with Dutch prime minister Mark Rutte, stressed that both sides enjoy huge capacity to boost all-out relations, economic cooperation in particular. He also met with his Azerbaijan Republic counterpart Ilham Aliyev, discussed issues of mutual interest with him. Rouhani also meted with President of European Commission José Manuel Barroso and has welcomed the development of relations between the Islamic Republic and European countries. Rouhani attended a meeting in presence of several managing directors of oil and gas companies on the sideline of the 44th World Economic Forum currently underway in Davos, Switzerland. President Hassan Rouhani, on the sidelines of the World Economic Forum (WEF) told world big oil companies directors that there are a lot of opportunities and very low risks and costs in investment in Iran. Rouhani invited world investors and industrialists to invest in all branches of Iran's industry, especially in energy and automobile ones and participate in Iran's economic development experience.
Oman	Muscat	March 11–13	Further information: Arab League–Iran relations President Rouhani visits Oman as his first Middle Eastern and Persian Gulf state in a two-days state visit of Oman. President and the Sultan Qaboos stressed development of relations between the two countries in all fields including energy, shipping, customs affairs, financial issues, environment, and tourism and maintaining Hormuz Strait security. The two leaders noted that regional tensions could be resolved through dialogue among regional countries.
Afghanistan	Kabul	March 27	Further information: Iran-Afghanistan relations Rouhani visits Afghanistan to attend Nowrouz festival with Persian language countries heads of states and governments. President Rouhani underlined the necessity of immediate withdrawal of all foreign forces from Afghanistan so that Afghan security could be maintained by Afghanistan's central government in a meeting with Afghan president Hamid Karzai after the ceremonies. Rouhani underlines joint action to maintain security, fight against terrorism, extremism in quardriateral meeting with presidents of Afghanistan, Pakistan and Tajikistan.
China	Beijing; Shanghai	May 20–22	Further information: Iran-China relations Rouhani travelled to People's Republic of China to attend the Conference on Interaction and Confidence Building Measures in Asia. Rouhani said that presence of Iran in the upcoming summit of the Conference on Interaction and Confidence Building Measures in Asia (CICA) is of great significance for restoration of peace and stability to the region. Rouhani opened the summit, noted that bolstering economic ties and joint investment schemes between CICA members can effectively help with regional convergence in a globalized economy and expressed Iran's views on various regional and international issues. Rouhani also met with his Chinese, Russian, Kazakh and Sri Lankan counterparts. He also confers with United Nations Secretary General Ban Ki-moon.
Turkey	Ankara	June 9–11	Further information: Iran-Turkey relations The visit took place at the official invitation of Turkish president Abdullah Gul. President Rouhani met several senior Turkish officials, including his counterpart and Prime Minister Recep Tayyip Erdogan. The president will also attend the first meeting of a joint committee for strategic cooperation, which was set up during Erdogan's trip to Tehran earlier this year. The two countries presidents exchanged views on the most important issues of mutual interest as well as the latest regional and international developments. President Hassan Rouhani reiterated that the economic cooperation between Iran and Turkey can help to improvement of economic conditions of the regional countries. Iran and Turkey also have signed 10 accords of cooperation in a meeting both presidents attended. The agreements reportedly were intended to 'deepen bilateral relations between Tehran and Ankara' more than ever.
Kazakhstan	Astana	September 8–10	Further information: Iran-Kazakhstan relations A high-ranking political and economic delegation, including a number of cabinet ministers, were accompanying Rouhani in his visit to Kazakhstan. President Rouhani pointed that Kazakhstan is an important neighbor of Iran, added that there is an extensive relation between Iran and the Kazakhstan in economy, science and technology fields. Iran and Kazakhstan also signed several agreements on cooperation in the fields of transportation, trade exchange and industry.
Tajikistan	Dushanbe	September 10–13	Further information: Iran-Tajikistan relations Rouhani traveled to Tajikistan for attending Shanghai Cooperation Organisation summit. In addition to summit, he met Tajik president Emomali Rahmon and conferred with his Chinese, Russian, Uzbek, Turkmen and Afghan presidents, as well as the Indian prime minister Narendra Modi during his two-day visit of Tajikistan. He discussed with Russian president Vladimir Putin on the course of nuclear talks between Iran and the P5+1 and voiced support for reaching a comprehensive solution between the negotiating parties by the November 24 deadline. Rouhani also attended the unveiling ceremony of Sangtuda 2 Hydroelectric Power Plant by video conference.
United Nations	New York City	September 22–28	Further information: Iran-United States relations President Rouhani arrived in New York's John F Kennedy Airport on 22 September to take part in the Sixty-ninth annual meeting of the United Nations General Assembly. He met with French president François Hollande, Austrian president Heinz Fischer, Venezuelan president Nicolás Maduro, Turkish president Recep Tayyip Erdogan, Slovenian president Borut Pahor, Iraqi president Fuad Masum, Guinean president Alpha Condé Bolivian president Evo Morales, United Kingdom prime minister David Cameron, Japanese prime minister Shinzō Abe, Iraqi prime minister Haider al-Abadi, Lebanese prime minister Tammam Salam, Georgian prime minister Irakli Garibashvili, German Foreign Minister Frank-Walter Steinmeier, UN Secretary General Ban Ki-moon and European Union president Herman Van Rompuy on the sideline of the United Nations General Assembly session. Rouhani addressed United Nations General Assembly on Morning schedule of 25 September. President Rouhani also addressed global concern on climate change in his speech at the Climate Summit in the UN headquarters in New York.
Russia	Astrakhan	September 28–30	Further information: Iran-Russia relations Rouhani arrived Astrakhan from New York City to attend in 4th summit of the Caspian Sea Littoral state. The heads of Caspian states signed four cooperation pacts and issue a joint statement. He also held talks with Russian president Vladimir Putin.
Azerbaijan	Baku	November 12–13	Further information: Iran-Azerbaijan relations Rouhani left for Baku, Azerbaijan for bilateral talks with high ranking Azeri officials. New era of Iran's engagement with other countries, the emphasis of the government on promotion of relations with neighbors, huge economic capacities of Iran and the country's remarkable progress in various scientific and technological fields have prepared the ground for cooperation with Azerbaijan, a Muslim and neighboring country. President Rouhani called the expansion of relations between Iran and Azerbaijan, and promoting the level of cooperation as the most important goals of his trip. Five agreements on bilateral cooperation signed between Iran and the Republic of Azerbaijan during visit to Baku of President Hassan Rouhani. Iran and Azerbaijan agreed to expand cooperation in the fields of energy, industry, transport and communications.

== 2015 ==
The following international trips were made by President Hassan Rouhani in 2015:

Country	Areas visited	Date(s)	Notes
Turkmenistan	Ashgabat	March 10–11	Further information: Iran-Turkmenistan relations President Rouhani visited Iran's northeastern neighbor at the top of a high-ranking political, economic, and cultural delegation attended a dinner banquet thrown in his honor by his Turkmen counterpart, President Gurbanguly Berdimuhamedow. In addition to meeting and holding talks with President Berdimuhamedow, President Rouhani attended the meeting of the two countries' high ranking delegations. It was at the end of that meeting the 17 cooperation documents were signed by the high-ranking officials of the two countries in the presence of both countries' presidents. Offering an address at the meeting of merchants and economic activists of Iran and Turkmenistan and participation in a joint press conference were among the other activities of the Iranian president in this visit.
Indonesia	Jakarta	April 21–23	Further information: Indonesia–Iran relations President Hassan Rouhani departed for Jakarta to attend a summit to be held in the Indonesian capital on April 22–24. The president is visiting Jakarta at the invitation of his Indonesian counterpart Joko Widodo to take part in the 60th anniversary of the Asian–African Conference known as Bandung Conference. On the sidelines of the conference, president Rouhani addressed the conference. Rouhani urged the international community to help eradicate terrorism and extremism. Rouhani met with Indonesian president Widodo which both sides referred to the importance of expanding and deepening cooperation between the two countries called for enhanced cooperation between Tehran and Jakarta on economic issues. He also met with Japanese prime minister Shinzo Abe, Chinese president Xi Jinping, Vietnamese president Truong Tan Sang, and Bangladeshi prime minister Sheikh Hasina. Rouhani has called on Muslims all over the world to speak out against the terrorist groups twisting the image of Islam in a meeting with intellectuals and Muslim scholars in Indonesia.
Russia	Ufa	July 8–10	Further information: Iran-Russia relations 7th BRICS summit Shanghai Cooperation Organisation
United Nations	New York City	September 25–29	Further information: Iran-USA relations Seventieth session of the United Nations General Assembly

== 2016 ==
The following international trips were made by President Hassan Rouhani in 2016:

Country	Areas visited	Date(s)	Notes
Italy	Rome	January 25–27	Further information: Iran-Italy relations
Vatican City	Vatican City	January 26	Further information: Holy See-Iran relations
France	Paris	January 27–29	Further information: France-Iran relations
Pakistan	Islamabad	March 25–26	Further information: Pakistan-Iran relations
Turkey	Istanbul	April 13–15	Further information: Turkey-Iran relations Organisation of Islamic Cooperation
Azerbaijan	Baku	August 7–9	Further information: Azerbaijan-Iran relations Further information: Iran-Russia relations
Venezuela	Porlamar; Caracas	September 16–19	Further information: Iran-Venezuela relations Non-Aligned Movement
Cuba	Havana	September 19–20	Further information: Iran-Cuba relations
United Nations	New York City	September 20–23	Further information: Category:Iran and the United Nations Seventy-first session of the United Nations General Assembly
Vietnam	Hanoi	October 5–7	Further information: Iran-Vietnam relations
Malaysia	Kuala Lumpur	October 7–8	Further information: Iran-Malaysia relations
Thailand	Bangkok	October 8–10	Further information: Iran-Thailand relations
Armenia	Yerevan	December 21	Further information: Iran-Armenia relations
Kazakhstan	Astana	December 21–22	Further information: Iran-Kazakhstan relations
Kyrgyzstan	Bishkek	December 22–23	Further information: Iran-Kyrgyzstan relations

== 2017 ==
The following international trips were made by President Hassan Rouhani in 2017:

Country	Areas visited	Date(s)	Notes
Oman	Muscat	February 15	Further information: Iran-Oman relations
Kuwait	Kuwait City	February 15–16	Further information: Iran-Kuwait relations
Pakistan	Islamabad	February 28 – March 1	Further information: Iran-Pakistan relations 13th ECO Summit
Russia	Moscow	March 27–28	Further information: Iran-Russia relations
Kazakhstan	Astana	September 7–11	Further information: Iran-Kazakhstan relations 1st OIC Summits on Science and Technology
United Nations	New York City	September 18–21	Further information: Category:Iran and the United Nations Seventy-second session of the United Nations General Assembly
Russia	Sochi	November 22–23	Further information: Iran-Russia relations
Turkey	Istanbul	December 13	Further information: Iran-Turkey relations 6th Extraordinary OIC Summits

== 2018 ==
The following international trips were made by President Hassan Rouhani in 2018:

Country	Areas visited	Date(s)	Notes
India	Hyderabad; New Delhi	February 15–17	Further information: Iran-India relations
Turkmenistan	Ashgabat	March 27	Further information: Iran-Turkmenistan relations
Azerbaijan	Baku	March 28	Further information: Iran-Azerbaijan relations
Turkey	Ankara	April 4	Further information: Iran-Turkey relations Attended the second summit of Russia, Turkey and Iran.
Turkey	Istanbul	May 18	Further information: Iran-Turkey relations 7th Extraordinary OIC Summits
China	Qingdao	June 9–10	Further information: Iran-China relations Further information: Iran-Russia relations 18th SCO Summits
Switzerland	Bern	July 2–3	Further information: Iran-Switzerland relations
Austria	Vienna	July 3–4	
Kazakhstan	Aktau	August 12	Further information: Iran-Russia relations Further information: Iran-Turkmenistan relations Further information: Iran-Kazakhstan relations Further information: Iran-Azerbaijan relations Fifth Caspian Summit
United Nations	New York City	September 23–26	Further information: Category:Iran and the United Nations Seventy-third session of the United Nations General Assembly
Turkey	Ankara	December 19–20	Further information: Iran-Turkey relations

== 2019 ==
The following international trips were made by President Hassan Rouhani in 2019:

Country	Areas visited	Date(s)	Notes
Russia	Sochi	February 14	Main article: Syrian peace process
Iraq	Baghdad; Karbala; Najaf	March 11–14	Main article: Iraq-Iran relations
Kyrgyzstan	Bishkek	June 14	
Turkey	Ankara	September 16	Working visit
United States	New York City	September 25	Main article: Iran–United States relations during the first Trump administration Working visit
Armenia	Yerevan	October 1	
Azerbaijan	Baku	October 23–24	Non-Aligned Movement

== Multilateral meetings ==
Group	Year							
Group	2013	2014	2015	2016	2017	2018	2019	2020
BRICS	26–27 March, (South Africa) Durban	14–16 July, (Brazil) Fortaleza	8–9 July, (Russia) Ufa	15–16 October, (India) Goa	3–5 September, (China) Xiamen	25-27 July, (South Africa) Johannesburg	2019, Brazil	2020, (Russia) Chelyabinsk
SCO	13 September, (Kyrgyzstan) Bishkek	11–12 September, (Tajikistan) Dushanbe	9–10 July, (Russia) Ufa	23–24 June, (Uzbekistan) Tashkent	8–9 June, (Kazakhstan) Astana	9–10 June, (China) Qingdao	2019, Kyrgyzstan	2020, (Russia) Chelyabinsk
UNGA	23-28 September, (United Nations) New York City	22–28 September, (United Nations) New York City	25–29 September, (United Nations) New York City	20–23 September, (United Nations) New York City	19–25 September, (United Nations) New York City	23–26 September, (United Nations) New York City		
GECF	1 July, (Russia) Moscow		23 November, (Iran) Tehran		24 November, (Bolivia) Santa Cruz		TBD, TBD	
NAM				13-18 September, (Venezuela) Porlamar			TBD, Azerbaijan	
OIC	6–7 February, (Egypt) Cairo			14–15 April, (Turkey) Istanbul	13 December, (Turkey) Istanbul	18 May, (Turkey) Istanbul		
INSTC				9 August, (Azerbaijan) Baku	1 November, (Iran) Tehran	TBD, (Russia) Moscow		
██ = Did not attend; ██ = Future event; ██ = No event ██ = Not elected

== See also ==
- List of international trips made by presidents of Iran
- List of state visits to Iran
- List of foreign visits to Supreme Leader Ali Khamenei
