= 6th BRICS summit =

2014 international summit in Brazil

6th BRICS Summit Sexta cúpula do BRICS
- 14–16 July 2014

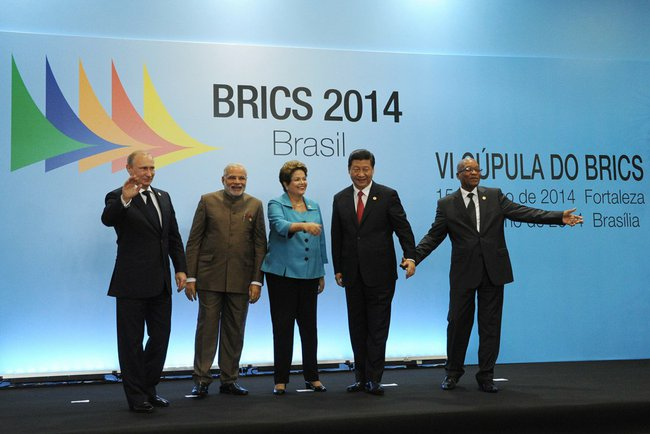
- Official logo
- Host country: Brazil
- Cities: Fortaleza and Brasília
- Venues: Centro de Eventos do Ceará
- Participants: Brazil; Russia; India; China; South Africa
- Website: brics6.itamaraty.gov.br

The 6th BRICS summit was the sixth annual diplomatic meeting of the BRICS, a grouping of major emerging economies that includes Brazil, Russia, India, China and South Africa. It was hosted by Brazil, as the first host country of the current five-year summit cycle; the host city was Fortaleza. Though Brazil had previously hosted a four-member BRIC summit in April 2010, 2014 marked its first full BRICS summit; the 2010 summit in Brasília did not officially include South Africa, who were only invited as guests as a prelude to their gaining full membership in December 2010. Argentine President Cristina Kirchner was a special guest of the summit, and the BRICS leaders met with their UNASUR counterparts shortly after. The 6th BRICS summit resulted in the official inauguration of the New Development Bank, a multilateral development bank intended as an alternative to the World Bank and International Monetary Fund.

== Background ==
Following the 2013 BRICS summit in Durban, South Africa, the BRICS countries released a joint statement summarising the results of their discussions and naming Brazil as the host country for the 2014 summit. Having agreed to set up a new international development bank during the 2013 summit, the member countries intended to complete the arrangements for the bank prior to the 2014 summit. The summit was initially scheduled for March 2014, but was shifted to a later date at China's request; it was ultimately held on 14–16 July 2014.

== Participants ==
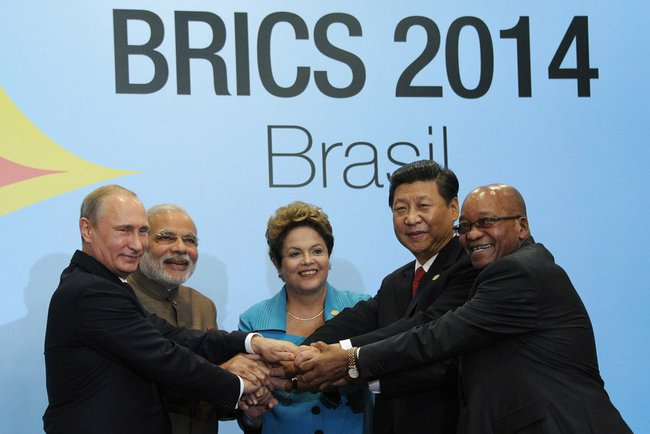
The BRICS leaders at the 6th BRICS summit. Left to right: Putin, Modi, Rousseff, Xi and Zuma.

The heads of state and heads of government that participated in the summit were:

**Core BRICS members** Host state and leader are shown in bold text.
Member		Represented by	Title
(Brazil)	**Brazil**	**Dilma Rousseff**	**President**
(Russia)	Russia	Vladimir Putin	President
(India)	India	Narendra Modi	Prime Minister
(China)	China	Xi Jinping	CCP General Secretary; President
(South Africa)	South Africa	Jacob Zuma	President

The 6th BRICS summit was Narendra Modi's first major international summit as Prime Minister of India. In addition to the five BRICS leaders, Cristina Fernández de Kirchner, President of Argentina, was invited to join the proceedings.

== Agenda ==
At the summit, the BRICS nations agreed to create the US$100 billion New Development Bank (NDB) to allow states to pool resources for economic stabilization. The countries also set forth plans to acquire reserves of $100 billion (€90.8b billion) through investment from the BRICS nations. The BRICS nations also signed an agreement on cooperation between the BRICS nations' export credit agencies: EXIAR (Russia); ABGF (Brazil), ECGC (India), SINOSURE (China) and ECIC (South Africa). In a press release, the group wrote: "We remain disappointed and seriously concerned with the current non-implementation of the 2010 International Monetary Fund (IMF) reforms, which negatively impacts on the IMF's legitimacy, credibility and effectiveness." The NDB is designed to represent all five of the group's member nations – its headquarters will be in Shanghai, the institution's first president will be from India, the bank's first regional office will be in Johannesburg, the inaugural chairman of the board of governors will be from Russia and the first chairman of the board of directors will be from Brazil. The presidency, with a term of five years, will rotate among the members of the BRICS.

== Bilateral meetings ==
During the summit, Xi Jinping was said to have told Narendra Modi that China was willing to consider expanding the Shanghai Cooperation Organisation to include India as a full member at the 2014 SCO summit. The summit further established the principles of non-interference and mutual benefit underpinning bilateral relations within the BRICS.

== BRICS–UNASUR summit ==
The BRICS held a summit with the UNASUR leaders in Brasília on 16 and 17 July.

Invited UNASUR heads of state

- Argentina – Cristina Fernández de Kirchner
- Bolivia – Evo Morales
- Chile – Michelle Bachelet
- Colombia – Juan Manuel Santos
- Ecuador – Rafael Correa
- Guyana – Donald Ramotar
- Paraguay – Horacio Cartes
- Peru – Ollanta Humala
- Suriname – Dési Bouterse
- Uruguay – José Mujica
- Venezuela – Nicolás Maduro

== Gallery of participating leaders ==
Members:

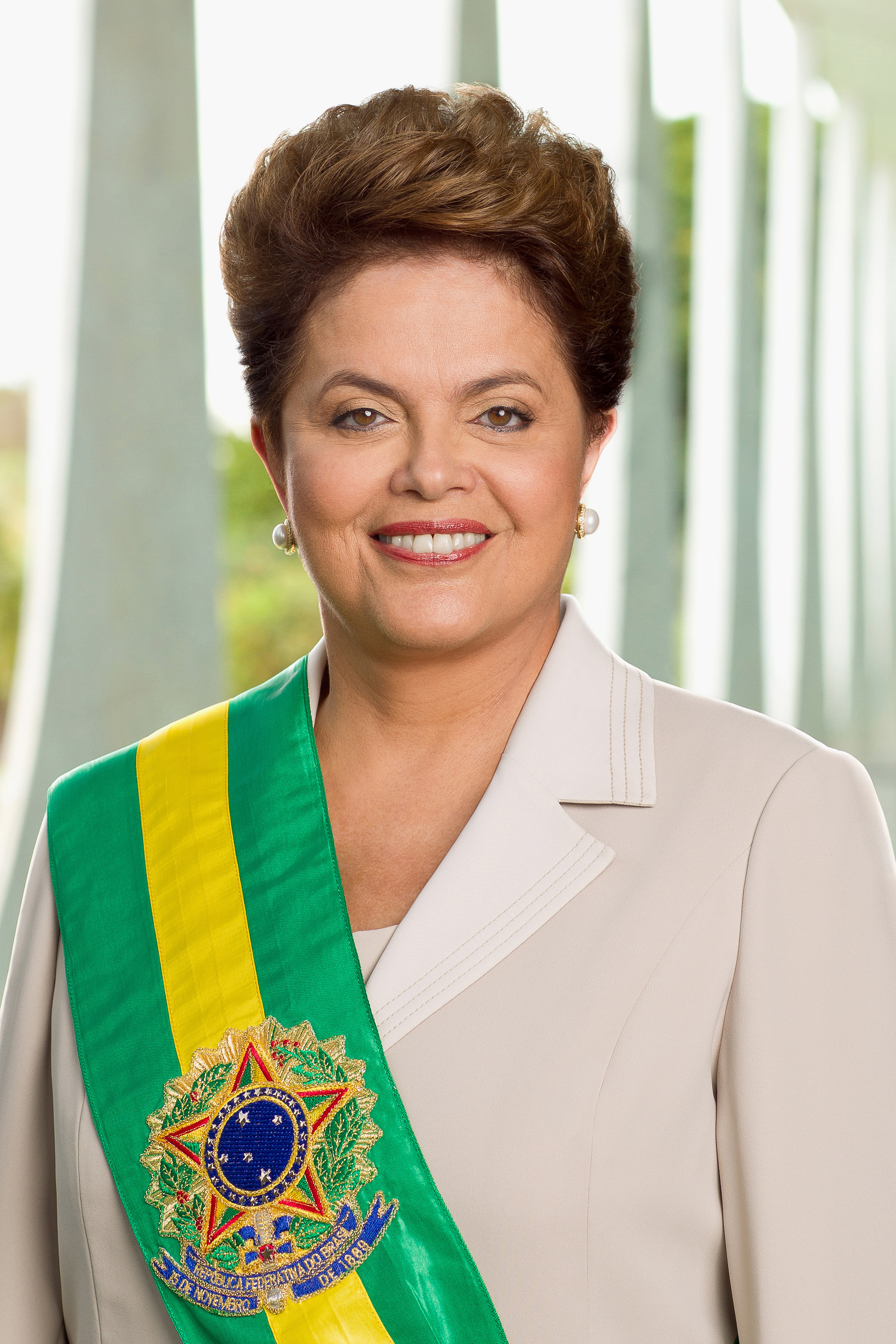
**Brazil**
**Dilma Rousseff, President (Host)**

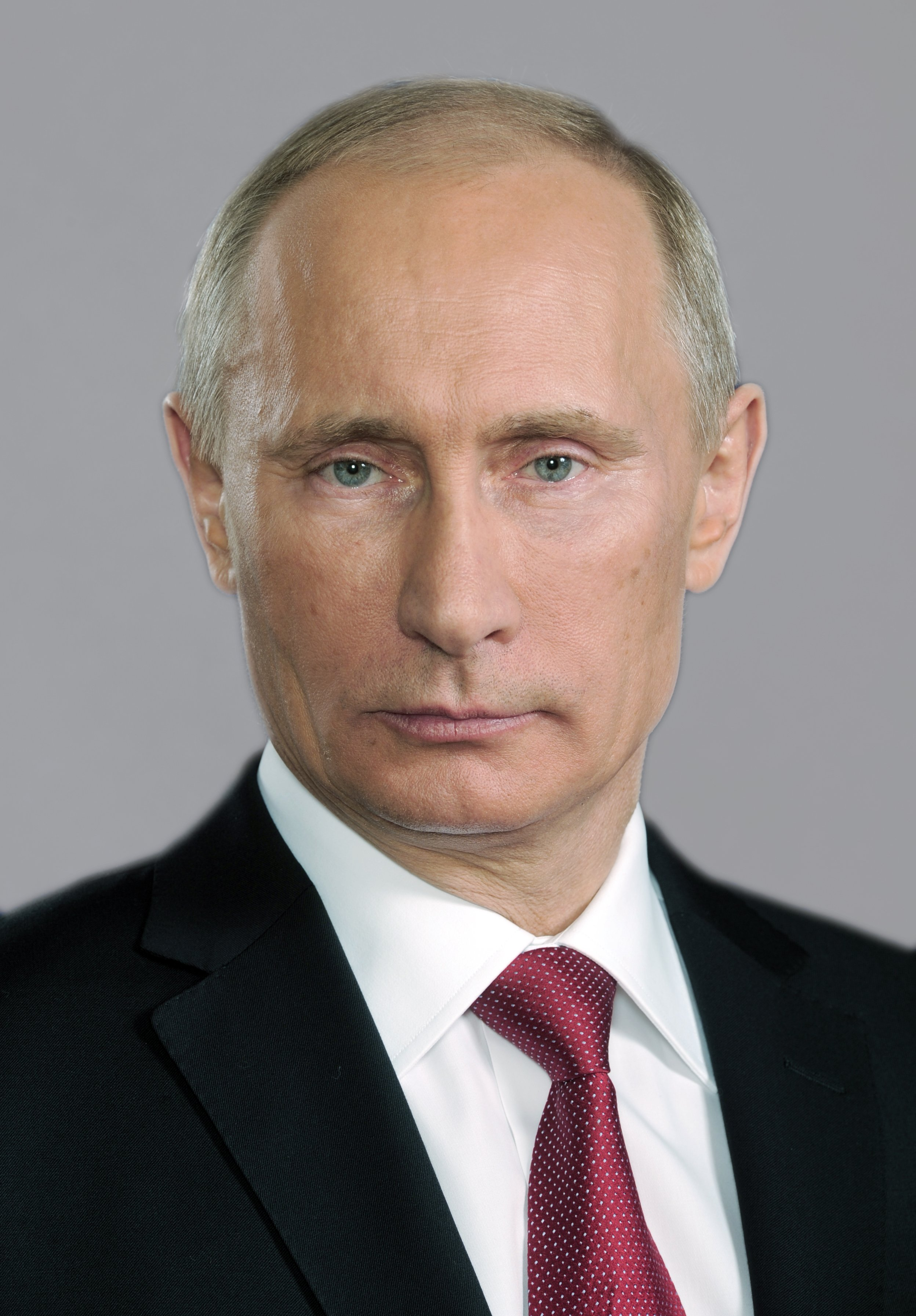
**Russia**
Vladimir Putin, President

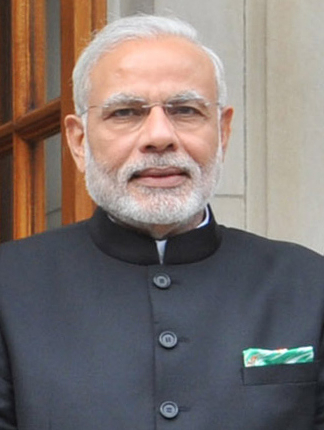
**India**
Narendra Modi, Prime Minister

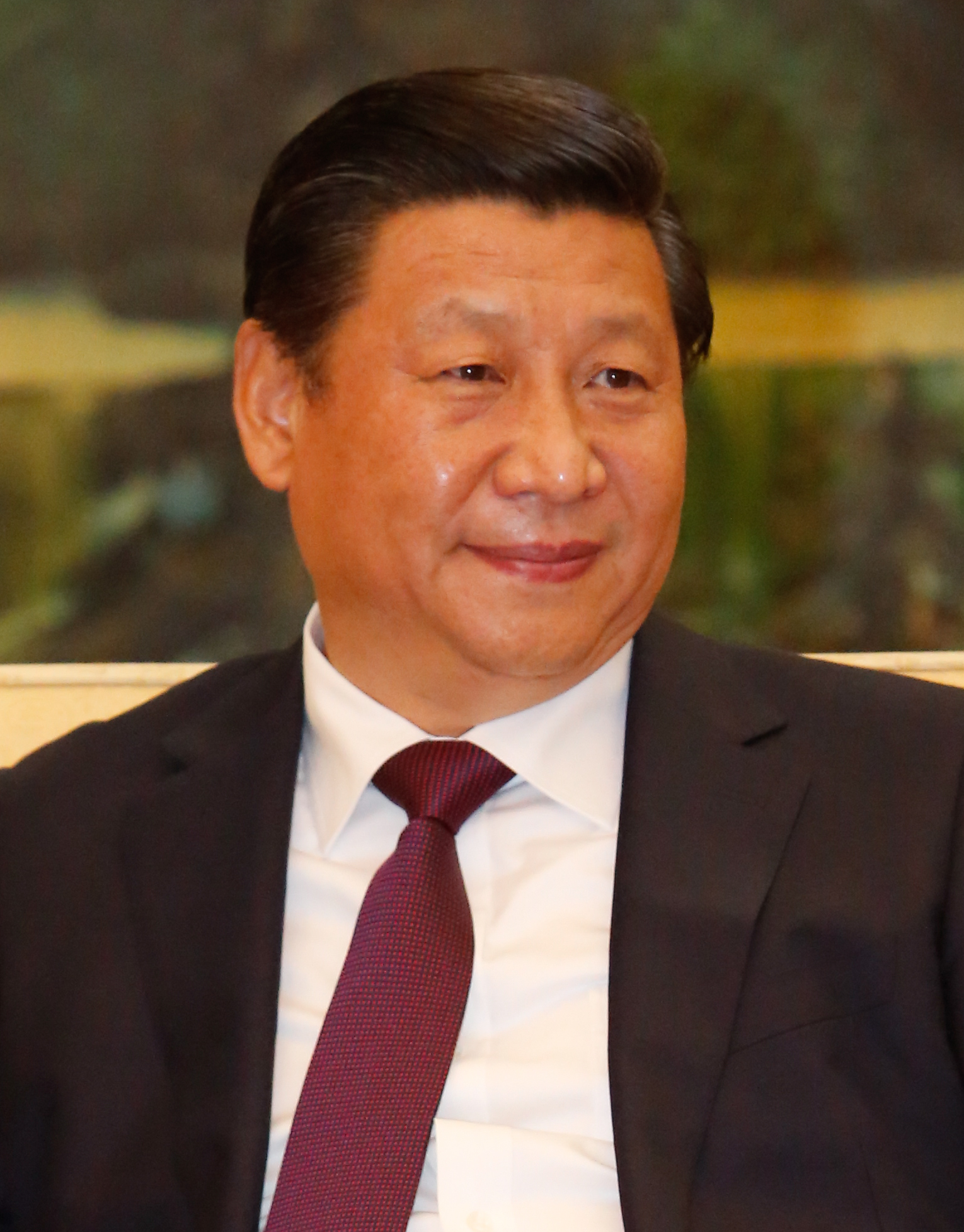
**China**
Xi Jinping, CCP General Secretary and President

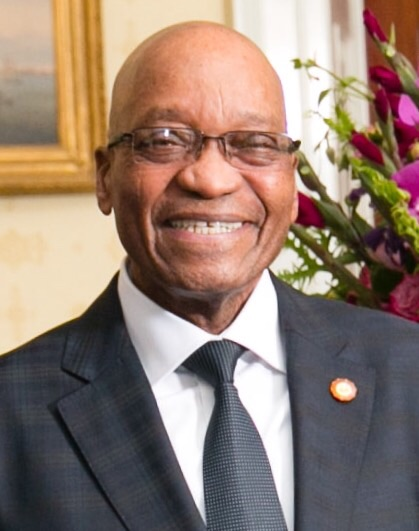
**South Africa**
Jacob Zuma, President
