= List of diplomatic visits to Iran =

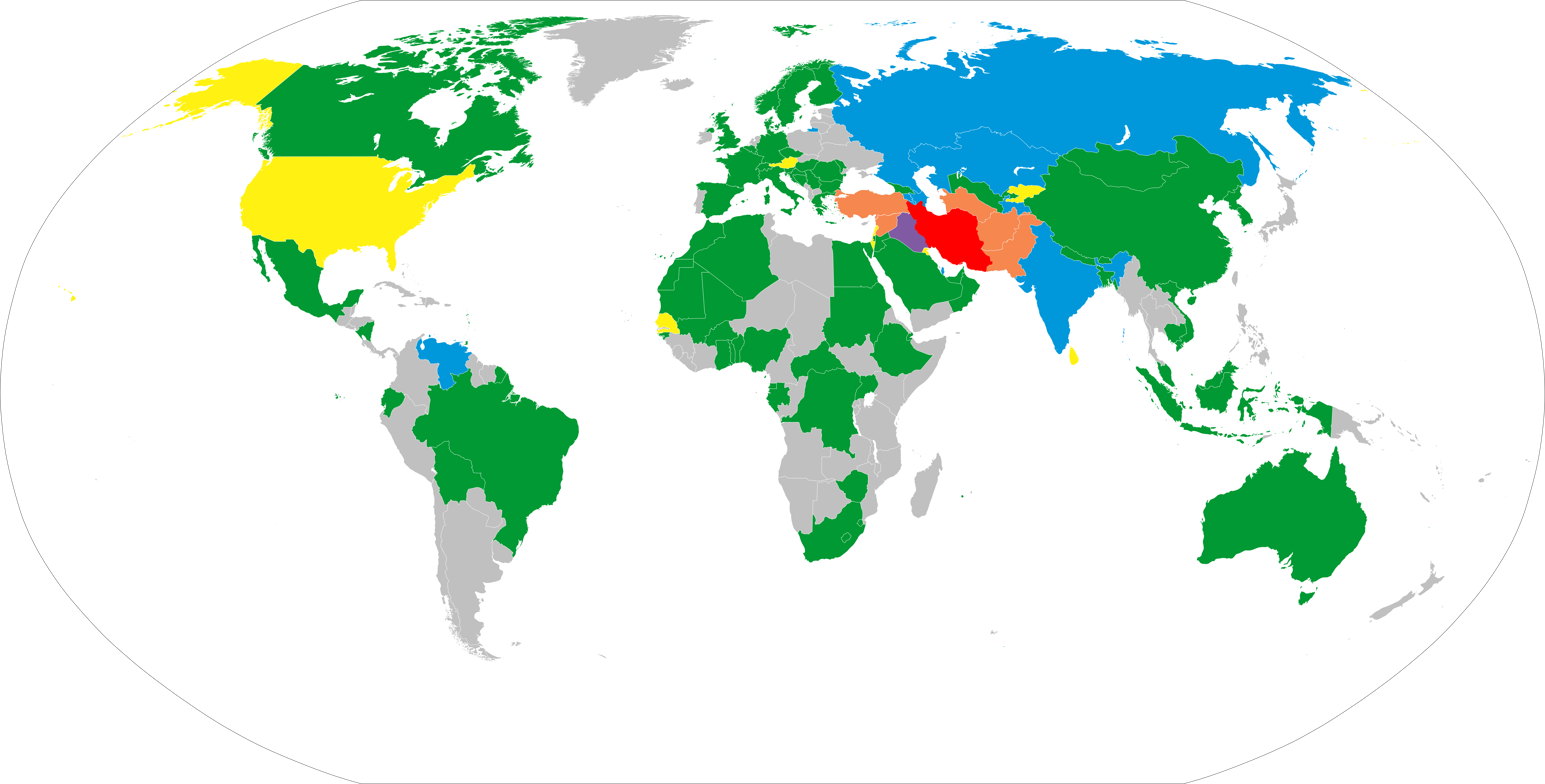
List of state visits to Iran up to 19 July 2022. 1–3 visits 4–5 visits 6–10 visits 11–20 visits 21 or more visits Iran

This is a list of foreign heads of state, heads of government who have visited Iran, which is classified by the Iranian Ministry of Foreign Affairs as either a state visit, official visit, or working visit.

== Scheduled future visits ==
Country	Guest	Title	Date
Pakistan	Shehbaz Sharif	Prime minister of Pakistan	TBD
Russia	Vladimir Putin	President of Russia	TBD

== Summary of visits ==
Country	Guest	Title	Date	Significance
• Islamic Republic of Iran (1979–present) •
Masoud Pezeshkian Presidency (2024–present)
Russia	Vladimir Putin	President	August 2026	Official visit
Egypt	Abdel Fattah El-Sisi	President	TBD	Official visit
Indonesia	Prabowo Subianto	President	TBD	Official visit
Turkey	Recep Tayyip Erdogan	President	TBD	Official visit
Pakistan	Shehbaz Sharif	Prime Minister	26 May 2025	Official visit
Qatar	Tamim bin Hamad Al Thani	Emir	29 February 2025	Official visit
Iraq	Mohammed Shia' Al Sudani	Prime Minister	8 January 2025	Official visit
Ebrahim Raisi Presidency (2021–2024)
Tajikistan	Emomali Rahmon	President	22 May 2024	Funeral of Ebrahim Raisi
Armenia	Nikol Pashinyan	Prime Minister	22 May 2024	Funeral of Ebrahim Raisi
Pakistan	Shahbaz Sharif	Prime Minister	22 May 2024	Funeral of Ebrahim Raisi
Iraq	Mohammed Shia' Al Sudani	Prime Minister	22 May 2024	Funeral of Ebrahim Raisi
Georgia	Irakli Kobakhidze	Prime Minister	22 May 2024	Funeral of Ebrahim Raisi
Azerbaijan	Ali Asadov	Prime Minister	22 May 2024	Funeral of Ebrahim Raisi
Turkey	Cevdet Yılmaz	Vice President	22 May 2024	Funeral of Ebrahim Raisi
India	Jagdeep Dhankhar	Vice President	22 May 2024	Funeral of Ebrahim Raisi
Tunisia	Kais Saied	President	22 May 2024	Funeral of Ebrahim Raisi
Syria	Hussein Arnous	Prime Minister	22 May 2024	Funeral of Ebrahim Raisi
Qatar	Tamim bin Hamad	Emir	22 May 2024	Funeral of Ebrahim Raisi
Burkina Faso	Apollinaire J. Kyélem de Tambèla	Prime Minister	26 April 2024	
Zimbabwe	Constantino Chiwenga	Vice President	26 April 2024	
Niger	Ali Lamine Zeine	Prime Minister	24 January 2024	
Cuba	Miguel Díaz-Canel	President	4 December 2023	
Iraq	Mohammed Shia' Al Sudani	Prime Minister	6 November 2023	
Uzbekistan	Shavkat Mirziyoyev	President	18 June 2023	
Oman	Haitham bin Tariq	Sultan	28 May 2023	
Pakistan	Shahbaz Sharif	Prime Minister	18 May 2023	
Iraq	Abdul Latif Rashid	President	29 April 2023	
Kazakhstan	Älihan Smaiylov	Prime Minister	25 April 2023	
Belarus	Alexander Lukashenko	President	13 March 2023	
Iraq	Mohammed Shia' al-Sudani	Prime Minister	29 November 2022	
Belarus	Roman Golovchenko	Prime Minister	22 November 2022	
Armenia	Nikol Pashinyan	Prime Minister	1 November 2022	
Russia	Vladimir Putin	President	19 July 2022	
Turkey	Recep Tayyip Erdoğan	President	19 July 2022	
Iraq	Mustafa Al-Kadhimi	Prime Minister	27 June 2022	
Kazakhstan	Kassym-Jomart Tokayev	President	19 June 2022	
Turkmenistan	Serdar Berdimuhamedow	President	15 June 2022	
Venezuela	Nicolás Maduro	President	10 June 2022	
Tajikistan	Emomali Rahmon	President	29 May 2022	
Qatar	Tamim bin Hamad	Emir	12 May 2022	
Syria	Bashar al-Assad	President	8 May 2022	
Iraq	Mustafa Al-Kadhimi	Prime Minister	12 September 2021	
Syria	Imad Khamis	Prime Minister	12 January 2020	
Qatar	Tamim bin Hamad	Emir	12 January 2020	
Pakistan	Imran Khan	Prime Minister	13 October 2021	
Algeria	Aymen Benabderrahmane	Prime Minister	5 August 2021	inauguration of Ebrahim Raisi
Armenia	Nikol Pashinyan	Prime Minister	5 August 2021	inauguration of Ebrahim Raisi
Iraq	Barham Salih	President	5 August 2021	inauguration of Ebrahim Raisi
Afghanistan	Ashraf Ghani	President	5 August 2021	inauguration of Ebrahim Raisi
Hassan Rouhani Presidency (2013–2021)
Iraq	Adil Abdul-Mahdi	Prime Minister	22 July 2019	
Tajikistan	Sirodjidin Aslov	Prime Minister	1 June 2019	
Pakistan	Imran Khan	Prime Minister	21–22 April 2019	
Iraq	Adil Abdul-Mahdi	Prime Minister	6 April 2019	
Syria	Bashar al-Assad	President	25–26 February 2019	
Iraq	Barham Salih	President	17 November 2018	
Russia	Vladimir Putin	President	7 September 2018	
Turkey	Recep Tayyip Erdoğan	President	7 September 2018	
Sri Lanka	Maithripala Sirisena	President	13 May 2018	
Russia	Vladimir Putin	President	1 November 2017	
Azerbaijan	Ilham Aliyev	President	1 November 2017	
Iraq	Haider al-Abadi	Prime Minister	26 October 2017	
Armenia	Karen Karapetyan	Prime Minister	9 October 2017	
Turkey	Recep Tayyip Erdoğan	President	4 October 2017	
Afghanistan	Ashraf Ghani	President	5 August 2017	Second inauguration of Hassan Rouhani
Armenia	Serzh Sargsyan	President	5 August 2017	Second inauguration of Hassan Rouhani
Iraq	Fuad Masum	President	5 August 2017	Second inauguration of Hassan Rouhani
Moldova	Igor Dodon	President	5 August 2017	Second inauguration of Hassan Rouhani
Zimbabwe	Robert Mugabe	President	5 August 2017	Second inauguration of Hassan Rouhani
Lesotho	Letsie III	King	5 August 2017	Second inauguration of Hassan Rouhani
Qatar	Abdullah bin Nasser bin Khalifa Al Thani	Prime Minister	5 August 2017	Second inauguration of Hassan Rouhani
Swaziland	Barnabas Sibusiso Dlamini	Prime Minister	5 August 2017	Second inauguration of Hassan Rouhani
Syria	Imad Khamis	Prime Minister	5 August 2017	Second inauguration of Hassan Rouhani
Iraq	Haider al-Abadi	Prime Minister	21 June 2017	
Georgia	Giorgi Kvirikashvili	Prime Minister	22–23 April 2017	
Azerbaijan	Ilham Aliyev	President	6–7 March 2017	
Sweden	Stefan Löfven	Prime Minister	11–12 February 2017	
Moldova	Igor Dodon	President	10 February 2017	Women's World Chess Championship 2017
Afghanistan	Abdullah Abdullah	Chief Executive Officer	11 January 2017	Funeral of Hashemi Rafsanjani
Indonesia	Joko Widodo	President	13–14 December 2016	
Slovenia	Borut Pahor	President	21–22 November 2016	
Bosnia and Herzegovina	Bakir Izetbegović	Chairmen of the Presidency	25 October 2016	
Finland	Sauli Niinistö	President	25–26 October 2016	
Venezuela	Nicolás Maduro	President	22 October 2016	
Bulgaria	Boyko Borissov	Prime Minister	11 July 2016	
India	Narendra Modi	Prime Minister	22 May 2016	
Afghanistan	Ashraf Ghani	President	22 May 2016	
Croatia	Kolinda Grabar-Kitarović	President	17 May 2016	
South Korea	Park Geun-hye	President	1 May 2016	
South Africa	Jacob Zuma	President	24 April 2016	
Serbia	Tomislav Nikolić	President	17 April 2016	
Italy	Matteo Renzi	Prime Minister	12 April 2016	
Kazakhstan	Nursultan Nazarbayev	President	11 April 2016	
Vietnam	Trương Tấn Sang	President	13 March 2016	
Turkey	Ahmet Davutoğlu	Prime Minister	4 March 2016	
Switzerland	Johann Schneider-Ammann	President	26 February 2016	
Azerbaijan	Ilham Aliyev	President	23 February 2016	
Ghana	John Dramani Mahama	President	14 February 2016	
Greece	Alexis Tsipras	Prime Minister	7 February 2016	
China	Xi Jinping	President; General Secretary (paramount leader)	22 January 2016	
Pakistan	Nawaz Sharif	Prime Minister	19 January 2016	
Afghanistan	Abdullah Abdullah	Chief Executive Officer	5 January 2016	
Hungary	Viktor Orbán	Prime Minister	1 December 2015	
Bolivia	Evo Morales	President	23 November 2015	Third GECF summit
Russia	Vladimir Putin	President	23 November 2015	Third GECF summit
Venezuela	Nicolás Maduro	President	23 November 2015	Third GECF summit
Equatorial Guinea	Teodoro Obiang Nguema Mbasogo	President	23 November 2015	Third GECF summit
Nigeria	Muhammadu Buhari	President	23 November 2015	Third GECF summit
Algeria	Abdelmalek Sellal	Prime Minister	23 November 2015	Third GECF summit
Azerbaijan	Ilham Aliyev	President	23 November 2015	Third GECF summit
Egypt	Abdel Fattah el-Sisi	President	23 November 2015	Third GECF summit
Kazakhstan	Karim Massimov	Prime Minister	23 November 2015	Third GECF summit
Qatar	Tamim bin Hamad Al Thani	Emir	23 November 2015	Third GECF summit
Trinidad and Tobago	Keith Rowley	Prime Minister	23 November 2015	Third GECF summit
Iraq	Fuad Masum	President	23 November 2015	Third GECF summit
Turkmenistan	Gurbanguly Berdimuhamedow	President	23 November 2015	Third GECF summit
Austria	Heinz Fischer	President	8 September 2015	
Kyrgyzstan	Almazbek Atambayev	President	5 September 2015	
Iraq	Nouri al-Maliki	Prime Minister	16 August 2015	
Iraq	Fuad Masum	President	13 May 2015	
Afghanistan	Ashraf Ghani	President	19 April 2015	
Turkey	Recep Tayyip Erdoğan	President	7 April 2015	
Kuwait	Sabah Al-Ahmad Al-Jaber Al-Sabah	Emir	1 June 2014	
Turkey	Recep Tayyip Erdoğan	Prime Minister	29–30 January 2014	
Afghanistan	Hamid Karzai	President	8 December 2013	
Oman	Qaboos bin Said al Said	Sultan	25 August 2013	
Afghanistan	Hamid Karzai	President	4 August 2013	First inauguration of Hassan Rouhani
Armenia	Serzh Sargsyan	President	4 August 2013	First inauguration of Hassan Rouhani
Guinea-Bissau	Manuel Serifo Nhamadjo	President	4 August 2013	First inauguration of Hassan Rouhani
Kazakhstan	Nursultan Nazarbayev	President	4 August 2013	First inauguration of Hassan Rouhani
Kuwait	Sabah Al-Khalid Al-Sabah	Prime Minister	4 August 2013	First inauguration of Hassan Rouhani
Kyrgyzstan	Almazbek Atambayev	President	4 August 2013	First inauguration of Hassan Rouhani
Lebanon	Michel Suleiman	President	4 August 2013	First inauguration of Hassan Rouhani
North Korea	Kim Yong-nam	President	4 August 2013	First inauguration of Hassan Rouhani
Pakistan	Asif Ali Zardari	President	4 August 2013	First inauguration of Hassan Rouhani
Qatar	Tamim bin Hamad Al Thani	Emir	4 August 2013	First inauguration of Hassan Rouhani
Sri Lanka	Mahinda Rajapaksa	President	4 August 2013	First inauguration of Hassan Rouhani
Swaziland	Barnabas Sibusiso Dlamini	Prime Minister	4 August 2013	First inauguration of Hassan Rouhani
Syria	Wael Nader Al-Halqi	Prime Minister	4 August 2013	First inauguration of Hassan Rouhani
Tajikistan	Emomali Rahmon	President	4 August 2013	First inauguration of Hassan Rouhani
Togo	Faure Gnassingbé	President	4 August 2013	First inauguration of Hassan Rouhani
Turkmenistan	Gurbanguly Berdimuhamedow	President	4 August 2013	First inauguration of Hassan Rouhani
Mahmoud Ahmadinejad Presidency (2005–2013)
Syria	Wael Nader al-Halqi	Prime Minister	15–16 January 2013	
United Nations	Ban Ki-moon	Secretary-General	26–31 August 2012	16th Non-Aligned Summit
United Nations General Assembly	Nassir Abdulaziz Al-Nasser	President	26–31 August 2012	16th Non-Aligned Summit
Afghanistan	Hamid Karzai	President	26–31 August 2012	16th Non-Aligned Summit
Benin	Yayi Boni	President	26–31 August 2012	16th Non-Aligned Summit
Burkina Faso	Blaise Compaoré	President	26–31 August 2012	16th Non-Aligned Summit
Central African Republic	François Bozizé	President	26–31 August 2012	16th Non-Aligned Summit
Djibouti	Ismail Omar Guelleh	President	26–31 August 2012	16th Non-Aligned Summit
Egypt	Mohamed Morsi	President	26–31 August 2012	16th Non-Aligned Summit
Gabon	Ali Bongo Ondimba	President	26–31 August 2012	16th Non-Aligned Summit
Guinea-Bissau	Manuel Serifo Nhamadjo	President	26–31 August 2012	16th Non-Aligned Summit
Lebanon	Michel Suleiman	President	26–31 August 2012	16th Non-Aligned Summit
Mauritania	Mohamed Ould Abdel Aziz	President	26–31 August 2012	16th Non-Aligned Summit
Mongolia	Tsakhiagiin Elbegdorj	President	26–31 August 2012	16th Non-Aligned Summit
North Korea	Kim Yong-nam	President	26–31 August 2012	16th Non-Aligned Summit
Pakistan	Asif Ali Zardari	President	26–31 August 2012	16th Non-Aligned Summit
Palestine	Mahmoud Abbas	President	26–31 August 2012	16th Non-Aligned Summit
Senegal	Macky Sall	President	26–31 August 2012	16th Non-Aligned Summit
Sri Lanka	Mahinda Rajapaksa	President	26–31 August 2012	16th Non-Aligned Summit
Sudan	Omar al-Bashir	President	26–31 August 2012	16th Non-Aligned Summit
Turkmenistan	Gurbanguly Berdimuhamedow	President	26–31 August 2012	16th Non-Aligned Summit
Uganda	Yoweri Museveni	President	26–31 August 2012	16th Non-Aligned Summit
Zimbabwe	Robert Mugabe	President	26–31 August 2012	16th Non-Aligned Summit
Tajikistan	Emomali Rahmon	President	26–31 August 2012	16th Non-Aligned Summit
Qatar	Hamad bin Khalifa Al Thani	Emir	26–31 August 2012	16th Non-Aligned Summit
Bangladesh	Sheikh Hasina	Prime Minister	26–31 August 2012	16th Non-Aligned Summit
Bhutan	Jigme Thinley	Prime Minister	26–31 August 2012	16th Non-Aligned Summit
Cambodia	Hun Sen	Prime Minister	26–31 August 2012	16th Non-Aligned Summit
India	Manmohan Singh	Prime Minister	26–31 August 2012	16th Non-Aligned Summit
Iraq	Nouri al-Maliki	Prime Minister	26–31 August 2012	16th Non-Aligned Summit
Morocco	Abdelillah Benkirane	Prime Minister	26–31 August 2012	16th Non-Aligned Summit
Nepal	Baburam Bhattarai	Prime Minister	26–31 August 2012	16th Non-Aligned Summit
Syria	Wael Nader al-Halqi	Prime Minister	26–31 August 2012	16th Non-Aligned Summit
Vietnam	Nguyen Tan Dung	Prime Minister	26–31 August 2012	16th Non-Aligned Summit
Turkey	Recep Tayyip Erdoğan	Prime Minister	27–28 March 2012	
Turkmenistan	Gurbanguly Berdimuhamedow	President	27 March 2011	2nd Norouz Festival
Iraq	Jalal Talabani	President	27 March 2011	2nd Norouz Festival
Tajikistan	Emomali Rahmon	President	27 March 2011	2nd Norouz Festival
Afghanistan	Hamid Karzai	President	27 March 2011	2nd Norouz Festival
Armenia	Serzh Sargsyan	President	27 March 2011	2nd Norouz Festival
Turkey	Abdullah Gül	President	13–16 February 2011	
Bolivia	Evo Morales	President	25–28 October 2010	
Venezuela	Hugo Chavez	President	19–21 October 2010	
Syria	Bashar al-Assad	President	2 October 2010	
Algeria	Abdelaziz Bouteflika	President	15–17 May 2010	14th G-15 summit
Brazil	Luiz Inácio Lula da Silva	President	15–17 May 2010	14th G-15 summit
Senegal	Abdoulaye Wade	President	15–17 May 2010	14th G-15 summit
Sri Lanka	Mahinda Rajapaksa	President	15–17 May 2010	14th G-15 summit
Zimbabwe	Robert Mugabe	President	15–17 May 2010	14th G-15 summit
Turkey	Recep Tayyip Erdogan	Prime Minister	15–17 May 2010	14th G-15 summit
Turkmenistan	Gurbanguly Berdimuhamedow	President	17–18 April 2010	Conference on Disarmament and Non-Proliferation
Iraq	Jalal Talabani	President	17–18 April 2010	Conference on Disarmament and Non-Proliferation
Turkmenistan	Gurbanguly Berdimuhamedow	President	27 March 2010	1st Norouz Festival
Iraq	Jalal Talabani	President	27 March 2010	1st Norouz Festival
Tajikistan	Emomali Rahmon	President	27 March 2010	1st Norouz Festival
Afghanistan	Hamid Karzai	President	27 March 2010	1st Norouz Festival
Venezuela	Hugo Chavez	President	5–6 September 2009	
Syria	Bashar al-Assad	President	19 August 2009	
Oman	Qaboos bin Said al Said	Sultan	4 August 2009	
Armenia	Serzh Sargsyan	President	13–14 April 2009	
Venezuela	Hugo Chavez	President	2–4 April 2009	
Turkey	Abdullah Gül	President	10–11 March 2009	10th summit of the ECO
Afghanistan	Hamid Karzai	President	10–11 March 2009	10th summit of the ECO
Tajikistan	Emomali Rahmon	President	10–11 March 2009	10th summit of the ECO
Turkmenistan	Gurbanguly Berdimuhamedow	President	10–11 March 2009	10th summit of the ECO
Azerbaijan	Ilham Aliyev	President	10–11 March 2009	10th summit of the ECO
Kyrgyzstan	Kurmanbek Bakiyev	President	10–11 March 2009	10th summit of the ECO
Pakistan	Yousaf Raza Gillani	Prime Minister	10–11 March 2009	10th summit of the ECO
Uzbekistan	Shavkat Mirziyoyev	Prime Minister	10–11 March 2009	10th summit of the ECO
Kazakhstan	Karim Massimov	Prime Minister	10–11 March 2009	10th summit of the ECO
Iraq	Nouri al-Maliki	Prime Minister	3–4 January 2009	
Ecuador	Rafael Correa	President	6 December 2008	
Bolivia	Evo Morales	President	1 September 2008	
Syria	Bashar al-Assad	President	2–3 August 2008	
Venezuela	Hugo Chavez	President	19 November 2007	
Russia	Vladimir Putin	President	16 October 2007	2nd Caspian Summit
Azerbaijan	Ilham Aliyev	President	16 October 2007	2nd Caspian Summit
Kazakhstan	Nursultan Nazarbayev	President	16 October 2007	2nd Caspian Summit
Turkmenistan	Gurbanguly Berdimuhamedow	President	16 October 2007	2nd Caspian Summit
Iraq	Nouri al-Maliki	Prime Minister	8–10 August 2007	
Venezuela	Hugo Chavez	President	1–2 July 2007	
Iraq	Jalal Talabani	President	26 June 2007	
Turkmenistan	Gurbanguly Berdimuhamedow	President	16 June 2007	
Nicaragua	Daniel Ortega	President	10 June 2007	
Syria	Bashar al-Assad	President	17–18 February 2007	
Turkey	Recep Tayyip Erdoğan	Prime Minister	2–3 December 2006	
Iraq	Jalal Talabani	President	27–29 November 2006	
Belarus	Alexander Lukashenko	President	5–7 November 2006	
Venezuela	Hugo Chavez	President	29–31 July 2006	
Armenia	Robert Kocharyan	President	5–6 July 2006	
Afghanistan	Hamid Karzai	President	27–28 May 2006	
Iraq	Jalal Talabani	President	21–23 November 2005	
Syria	Bashar al-Assad	President	7–8 August 2005	
Mohammad Khatami Presidency (1997–2005)
Venezuela	Hugo Chavez	President	28–29 December 2004	
Turkey	Recep Tayyip Erdoğan	Prime Minister	28–30 July 2004	
Indonesia	Megawati Sukarnoputri	President	18 February 2004	D-8 4th Summit
Nigeria	Olusegun Obasanjo	President	18 February 2004	D-8 4th Summit
Turkey	Ahmet Necdet Sezer	President	18 February 2004	D-8 4th Summit
Malaysia	Abdullah Ahmad Badawi	President	18 February 2004	D-8 4th Summit
Pakistan	Zafarullah Khan Jamali	Prime Minister	18 February 2004	D-8 4th Summit
Bangladesh	Khaleda Zia	Prime Minister	18 February 2004	D-8 4th Summit
Austria	Thomas Klestil	President	24–27 January 2004	
Cuba	Fidel Castro	President	9 May 2001	
India	Atal Bihari Vajpayee	Prime Minister	10–13 April 2001	
China	Jiang Zemin	President	April 2001	
Afghanistan	Burhanuddin Rabbani	President	10 June 2000	ECO 6th Summit
Azerbaijan	Heydar Aliyev	President	10 June 2000	ECO 6th Summit
Kyrgyzstan	Askar Akaev	President	10 June 2000	ECO 6th Summit
Tajikistan	Emomali Rahmonov	President	10 June 2000	ECO 6th Summit
Turkmenistan	Saparmurat Niyazov	President	10 June 2000	ECO 6th Summit
Uzbekistan	Islam Karimov	President	10 June 2000	ECO 6th Summit
Kazakhstan	Kassym-Jomart Tokayev	Prime Minister	10 June 2000	ECO 6th Summit
Pakistan	Pervez Musharraf	Chief Executive	10 June 2000	ECO 6th Summit
Austria	Thomas Klestil	President	September 1999	
Belarus	Alexander Lukashenko	President	6–9 March 1998	
United Nations	Kofi Annan	Secretary-General	9–11 December 1997	OIC 8th Summit
Palestine Liberation Organization	Yasser Arafat	Chairman	9–11 December 1997	OIC 8th Summit
Pakistan	Nawaz Sharif	Prime Minister	9–11 December 1997	OIC 8th Summit
Lebanon	Rafic Hariri	Prime Minister	9–11 December 1997	OIC 8th Summit
Bangladesh	Sheikh Hasina	Prime Minister	9–11 December 1997	OIC 8th Summit
Morocco	Abdellatif Filali	Prime Minister	9–11 December 1997	OIC 8th Summit
Turkey	Süleyman Demirel	President	9–11 December 1997	OIC 8th Summit
Lebanon	Elias Hrawi	President	9–11 December 1997	OIC 8th Summit
Syria	Hafez al-Assad	President	9–11 December 1997	OIC 8th Summit
Azerbaijan	Heydar Aliyev	President	9–11 December 1997	OIC 8th Summit
Afghanistan	Burhanuddin Rabbani	President	9–11 December 1997	OIC 8th Summit
Sudan	Omar al-Bashir	President	9–11 December 1997	OIC 8th Summit
Senegal	Abdou Diouf	President	9–11 December 1997	OIC 8th Summit
Yemen	Ali Abdullah Saleh	President	9–11 December 1997	OIC 8th Summit
Mali	Alpha Oumar Konaré	President	9–11 December 1997	OIC 8th Summit
Kuwait	Jaber Al-Ahmad Al-Sabah	Emir	9–11 December 1997	OIC 8th Summit
Qatar	Hamad bin Khalifa Al Thani	Emir	9–11 December 1997	OIC 8th Summit
Bosnia and Herzegovina	Alija Izetbegović	Chairmen of the Presidency	9–11 December 1997	OIC 8th Summit
Morocco	Hassan II	King	9–11 December 1997	OIC 8th Summit
Akbar Hashemi Rafsanjani Presidency (1989–1997)
Indonesia	Suharto	President	23 November 1993	State Visit
Pakistan	Nawaz Sharif	Prime Minister	16–17 February 1992	1st ECO Summit
Turkey	Turgut Ozal	President	16–17 February 1992	1st ECO Summit
Azerbaijan	Ayaz Mutallibov	President	16–17 February 1992	1st ECO Summit
Turkmenistan	Saparmurat Niyazov	President	16–17 February 1992	1st ECO Summit
Romania	Nicolae Ceaușescu	President	18–20 December 1989	State visit
Mir-Hossein Mousavi Prime Ministership (1981–1989)
Sudan	Sadiq al-Mahdi	Prime Minister	late 1986	
United Nations	Kurt Waldheim	Secretary-General	5 January 1980	
• Interim Government of Iran (1979) •
Mehdi Bazargan Prime Ministership (1979)
Palestine Liberation Organization	Yasser Arafat	Chairman	17 February 1979	
• Imperial State of Iran (1925–1979) •
Mohammad Reza Pahlavi Reign (1941–1979)
Japan	Takeo Fukuda	Prime Minister	September	
China	Hua Guofeng	Premier; Party Chairman	28 August 1978	
India	Morarji Desai	Prime Minister	June 1978	stop over
Israel	Menachem Begin	Prime Minister	22 February 1978	
United States	Jimmy Carter	President	31 December 1977 – 1 January 1978	Official visit
Jordan	Hussein	King	31 December 1977 – 1 January 1978	
Italy	Giovanni Leone	President	1977	State visit
Israel	Yitzhak Rabin	Prime Minister	16 July 1976	
Israel	Yitzhak Rabin	Prime Minister	16 August 1975	
Syria	Hafez al-Assad	President	1975	
Mexico	Luis Echeverría	President	July 1975	Official visit
Saudi Arabia	Prince Fahd	Crown Prince	July 1975	
Indonesia	Suharto	President	26 June 1975	State Visit
Egypt	Anwar Sadat	President	23 April 1975	
Poland	Piotr Jaroszewicz	Prime Minister	1974	
Poland	Piotr Jaroszewicz	Prime Minister	1974	
India	Indira Gandhi	Prime Minister	28 April – 2 May 1974	State visit
United States	Richard Nixon	President	30–31 May 1972	Official visit
West Germany	Willy Brandt	Chancellor	5 March 1972	
Australia	Paul Hasluck	Governor-General	12–16 October 1971	2,500 year celebration of the Persian Empire
Ethiopia	Haile Selassie	Emperor	12–16 October 1971	2,500 year celebration of the Persian Empire
Denmark	Frederik IX	King	12–16 October 1971	2,500 year celebration of the Persian Empire
Belgium	Baudouin	King	12–16 October 1971	2,500 year celebration of the Persian Empire
Jordan	Hussein	King	12–16 October 1971	2,500 year celebration of the Persian Empire
Nepal	Mahendra	King	12–16 October 1971	2,500 year celebration of the Persian Empire
Norway	Olav V	King	12–16 October 1971	2,500 year celebration of the Persian Empire
Greece	Constantine II	King	12–16 October 1971	2,500 year celebration of the Persian Empire
Lesotho	Moshoeshoe II	King	12–16 October 1971	2,500 year celebration of the Persian Empire
Bahrain	Isa bin Salman Al Khalifa	Emir	12–16 October 1971	2,500 year celebration of the Persian Empire
Qatar	Ahmad bin Ali Al Thani	Emir	12–16 October 1971	2,500 year celebration of the Persian Empire
Kuwait	Sabah III Al-Salim Al-Sabah	Emir	12–16 October 1971	2,500 year celebration of the Persian Empire
Oman	Qaboos bin Said al Said	Sultan	12–16 October 1971	2,500 year celebration of the Persian Empire
Malaysia	Abdul Halim of Kedah	Yang di-Pertuan Agong	12–16 October 1971	2,500 year celebration of the Persian Empire
Luxembourg	Jean	Grand Duke	12–16 October 1971	2,500 year celebration of the Persian Empire
Sweden	Carl Gustaf	Crown Prince	12–16 October 1971	2,500 year celebration of the Persian Empire
Spain	Juan Carlos	Crown Prince	12–16 October 1971	2,500 year celebration of the Persian Empire
United Arab Emirates	Zayed bin Sultan Al Nahyan	President	12–16 October 1971	2,500 year celebration of the Persian Empire
Canada	Roland Michener	Governor General	12–16 October 1971	2,500 year celebration of the Persian Empire
Yugoslavia	Josip Broz Tito	President	12–16 October 1971	2,500 year celebration of the Persian Empire
Soviet Union	Nikolai Podgorny	President	12–16 October 1971	2,500 year celebration of the Persian Empire
Austria	Franz Jonas	President	12–16 October 1971	2,500 year celebration of the Persian Empire
Bulgaria	Todor Zhivkov	President	12–16 October 1971	2,500 year celebration of the Persian Empire
Brazil	Emílio Garrastazu Médici	President	12–16 October 1971	2,500 year celebration of the Persian Empire
Finland	Urho Kekkonen	President	12–16 October 1971	2,500 year celebration of the Persian Empire
Turkey	Cevdet Sunay	President	12–16 October 1971	2,500 year celebration of the Persian Empire
Hungary	Pál Losonczi	President	12–16 October 1971	2,500 year celebration of the Persian Empire
Czechoslovakia	Ludvík Svoboda	President	12–16 October 1971	2,500 year celebration of the Persian Empire
Pakistan	Yahya Khan	President	12–16 October 1971	2,500 year celebration of the Persian Empire
Lebanon	Suleiman Franjieh	President	12–16 October 1971	2,500 year celebration of the Persian Empire
Liechtenstein	Franz Josef II	Prince	12–16 October 1971	2,500 year celebration of the Persian Empire
South Africa	Jacobus Johannes Fouché	President	12–16 October 1971	2,500 year celebration of the Persian Empire
Senegal	Leopold Sedar Senghor	President	12–16 October 1971	2,500 year celebration of the Persian Empire
India	V. V. Giri	President	12–16 October 1971	2,500 year celebration of the Persian Empire
Indonesia	Suharto	President	12–16 October 1971	2,500 year celebration of the Persian Empire
Mauritania	Moktar Ould Daddah	President	12–16 October 1971	2,500 year celebration of the Persian Empire
Monaco	Rainier III	Prince	12–16 October 1971	2,500 year celebration of the Persian Empire
Dahomey	Hubert Maga	President	12–16 October 1971	2,500 year celebration of the Persian Empire
Romania	Nicolae Ceauşescu	President	12–16 October 1971	2,500 year celebration of the Persian Empire
Zaire	Mobutu Sese Seko	President	12–16 October 1971	2,500 year celebration of the Persian Empire
Switzerland	Rudolf Gnägi	President	12–16 October 1971	2,500 year celebration of the Persian Empire
Swaziland	Makhosini Dlamini	Prime Minister	12–16 October 1971	2,500 year celebration of the Persian Empire
France	Jacques Chaban-Delmas	Prime Minister	12–16 October 1971	2,500 year celebration of the Persian Empire
South Korea	Kim Jong-pil	Prime Minister	12–16 October 1971	2,500 year celebration of the Persian Empire
Italy	Emilio Colombo	Prime Minister	12–16 October 1971	2,500 year celebration of the Persian Empire
Holy See	Paul VI	Pope	25 November 1970	
South Korea	Park Chung-hee	President	1969	
United Nations	U Thant	Secretary-General	8 February 1968	
Israel	Levi Eshkol	Prime Minister	19 June 1966	
Saudi Arabia	King Faisal	King	1966	
Finland	Urho Kekkonen	President	11–12 February 1965	
Norway	Olav V	King	7–14 January 1965	
France	Charles de Gaulle	President	21 March 1963	Official visit
Israel	David Ben-Gurion	Prime Minister	4 November 1961	
United Kingdom	Elizabeth II	Queen	2–6 March 1961	
United States	Dwight D. Eisenhower	President	14 December 1959	Addressed Iranian Parliament
India	Jawaharlal Nehru	Prime Minister	September 1959	
Jordan	Hussein	King	2 May 1959	
Iraq	Nuri as-Said	Prime Minister	16 April 1956	CENTO Summit
Turkey	Adnan Menderes	Prime Minister	16 April 1956	CENTO Summit
Soviet Union	Joseph Stalin	Premier; General Secretary	27 November – 2 December 1943	Tehran Conference
United Kingdom	Winston Churchill	Prime Minister	27 November – 2 December 1943	Tehran Conference
United States	Franklin D. Roosevelt	President	27 November – 2 December 1943	Tehran Conference
United Kingdom	Winston Churchill	Prime Minister	20 August 1942	
Reza Shah Reign (1925–1941)
• Sublime State of Iran (1907–1925) •

== Most visited official ==
As of 19 July 2022

Country	Official	Visit	Last Visit
Turkmenistan	Gurbanguly Berdimuhamedow	9	23 November 2015
Turkey	Recep Tayyip Erdoğan	9	19 July 2022
Syria	Bashar al-Assad	7	8 May 2022
Tajikistan	Emomali Rahmon	7	29 May 2022
Afghanistan	Hamid Karzai	7	8 December 2013
Venezuela	Hugo Chavez	7	19–21 October 2010
Azerbaijan	Ilham Aliyev	6	1 November 2017
Iraq	Jalal Talabani	6	27 March 2011
Russia	Vladimir Putin	5	19 July 2022
Afghanistan	Ashraf Ghani	4	5 August 2021
Iraq	Nouri al-Maliki	4	16 August 2015
Armenia	Serzh Sargsyan	4	5 August 2017
Qatar	Tamim bin Hamad Al Thani	4	12 May 2022

== Most visit by country ==
As of 29 November 2022

Country	Visit	Last Visit
Iraq	22	29 November 2022
Turkey	17	19 July 2022
Afghanistan	15	5 August 2021
Syria	14	8 May 2022
Pakistan	11	13 October 2021
Turkmenistan	11	23 November 2015
Venezuela	10	10 June 2022
Azerbaijan	9	1 November 2017
Qatar	8	12 May 2022
Tajikistan	8	29 May 2022
Armenia	8	1 November 2022
(Soviet Union) Russia	7	19 July 2022
India	7	22 May 2016
Kazakhstan	7	19 June 2022
Indonesia	5	13–14 December 2016
Israel	5	22 February 1978
Lebanon	5	4 August 2013
Austria	4	8 September 2015
Kuwait	4	1 June 2014
Kyrgyzstan	4	5 September 2015
Senegal	4	26–31 August 2012
Sri Lanka	4	13 May 2018
United States	4	1 January 1978

== See also ==
- List of international trips made by presidents of Iran
- List of international presidential trips made by Hassan Rouhani
- List of official overseas trips made by monarchs of Iran
- List of diplomatic visits to Iraq
