= Iran–Kyrgyzstan relations =

- Iran: Kyrgyzstan

Iran–Kyrgyzstan relations are foreign and diplomatic relations between Kyrgyzstan and Iran. Bilateral relations between Iran and Kyrgyzstan are mostly even and somewhat relaxed.

== Trade ==
Iran mainly exports clothing, nuts, paints and flooring to Kyrgyzstan and imports meat, grain and steel scraps. 180 industrial units are currently operating in Kyrgyzstan. According to the Iranian Finance Minister, the previously signed preferential trade agreement could be turned into a free trade agreement by the two sides to enhance the two-way trade.

The two countries signed agreements on cooperation in the spheres of transport, customs, trade and economic relations. Iran and Kyrgyzstan interact in the spheres of education, culture, travel, customs, finances, war on trafficking and crime in general.

The two countries trade in agriculture and capital goods. In 2008, Iran promised Kyrgyzstan 200 million euros for some economic projects. Iranian companies participated in the construction of a highway connecting Bishkek and Osh. Iran and Kyrgyzstan hope to up the annual trade turnover to $100 million.

In negotiations held during a visit of Akylbek Zhaparov to Iran in July 2012, Iran expressed a wish to pour more than $1 billion into short-term projects in Kyrgyzstan and more than $10 billion into long-term projects.

During a meeting between the Iranian foreign minister and the deputy foreign minister of Kyrgyzstan in 2019, they expressed their intentions of launching flights between the two states, according to IFP News. According to Azer News, the ambassador of Iran to Kyrgyzstan Republic, Ali Mojitaba in 2019, disclosed that the trade volume between Iran and Kyrgyzstan has totaled to over $44 million.

== Security ==
On 5 December 2021, Kyrgyzstan’s Vice President, Taalatbek Masadykov, met with Iranian Foreign Minister Hossein Amir Abdollahian in Tehran to discuss working together to fight drug trafficking and exchange experiences in border security.

== See also ==
- Foreign relations of Iran
- Foreign relations of Kyrgyzstan
