= 2014 Dushanbe SCO summit =

2014 SCO summit
- Host country: Tajikistan
- Date: 11–12 September 2014
- Cities: Dushanbe

The 2014 SCO summit was the 13th annual summit of heads of state of the Shanghai Cooperation Organisation held between 11 and 12 September in Dushanbe, Tajikistan. Security was among the top issues for 13th annual summit and all members during the last meeting reached a consensus on fighting against separatism, extremism and terrorism, as well as on safeguarding regional peace and security therefore Afghanistan will be focal point during talks in Dushanbe, claim some diplomats of member countries.

== Background ==
In the build-up to the summit, a foreign ministers meeting was held on 30 July. It was hosted by Sirodjidin Aslov and was also attended by Secretary-General Dmitry Mezentsev of Russia. Russian Foreign Minister Sergey Lavrov offered assistance in stabilising the border with Afghanistan. In the final communique, Aslov said:

At the meeting we approved the draft resolution of the Council of Heads of State 'On the SCO Draft Development Strategy until 2025,' which will determine the guidelines for future interaction and improve our action efficiency. The current meeting’s peculiarity is that the work on the coordination and preparation of legal documents on the admission of new members is actually on the homestretch. The delegations' heads have approved draft procedures for the granting of SCO member status and a new version of the model memorandum on the obligations of applicant states, seeking the SCO member state status.

Military exercises will commence on 24 August, scheduled to be the biggest in 10 years. A joint anti-terrorist drill was also held in China from 24 to 29 August with about 7,000 troops including over 200 Tajiks, over 480 Kyrgyz who were the first to arrive. By 12, August, over 1,000 non-Chinese soldiers and officers were headed to Inner Mongolia via road, rail and air. There were also 12 Russian aircraft in the exercise.

Chinese Foreign Minister Wang Yi also visited Dushanbe about a month before the summit, as did Uzbek Foreign Minister Abdulaziz Kamilov. The corresponding heads of government meeting will take place in December in Astana, Kazakhstan.

== Attending delegations ==
The heads of state of the six countries participated in the summit.

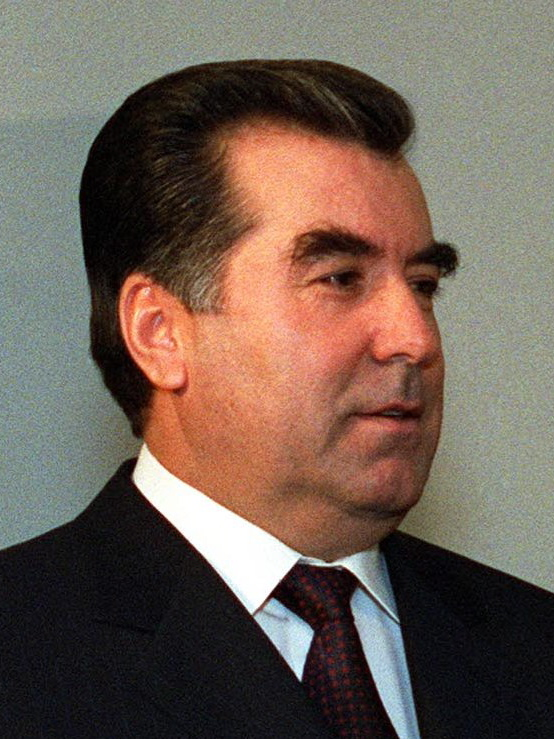
(Tajikistan) Emomali Rahmon
President of Tajikistan
(host)

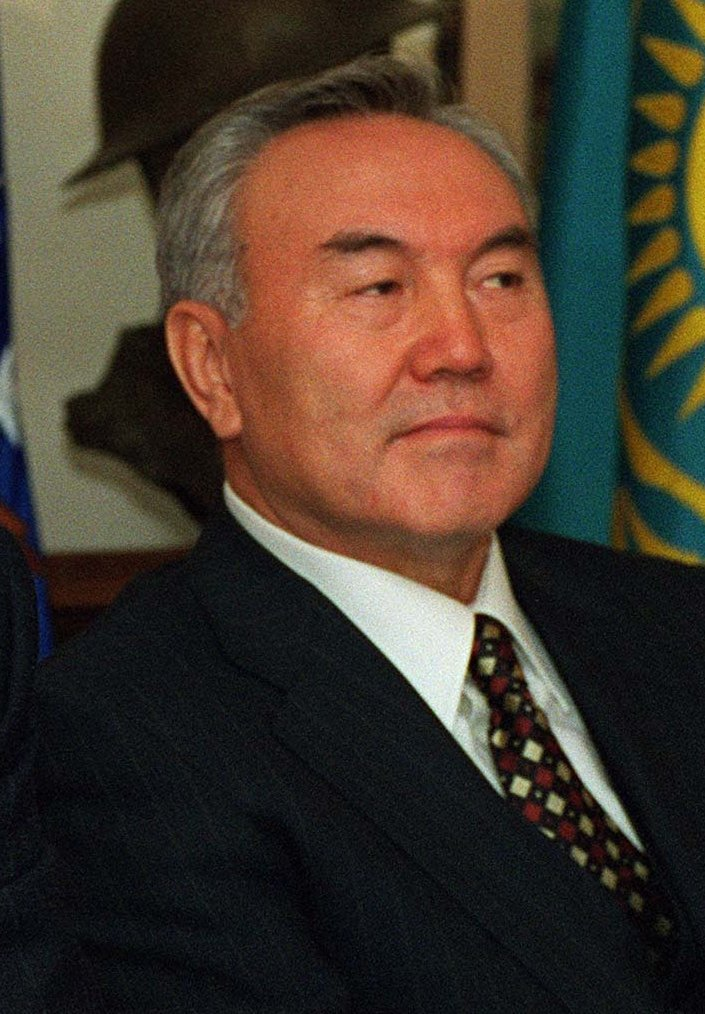
(Kazakhstan) Nursultan Nazarbayev
President of Kazakhstan

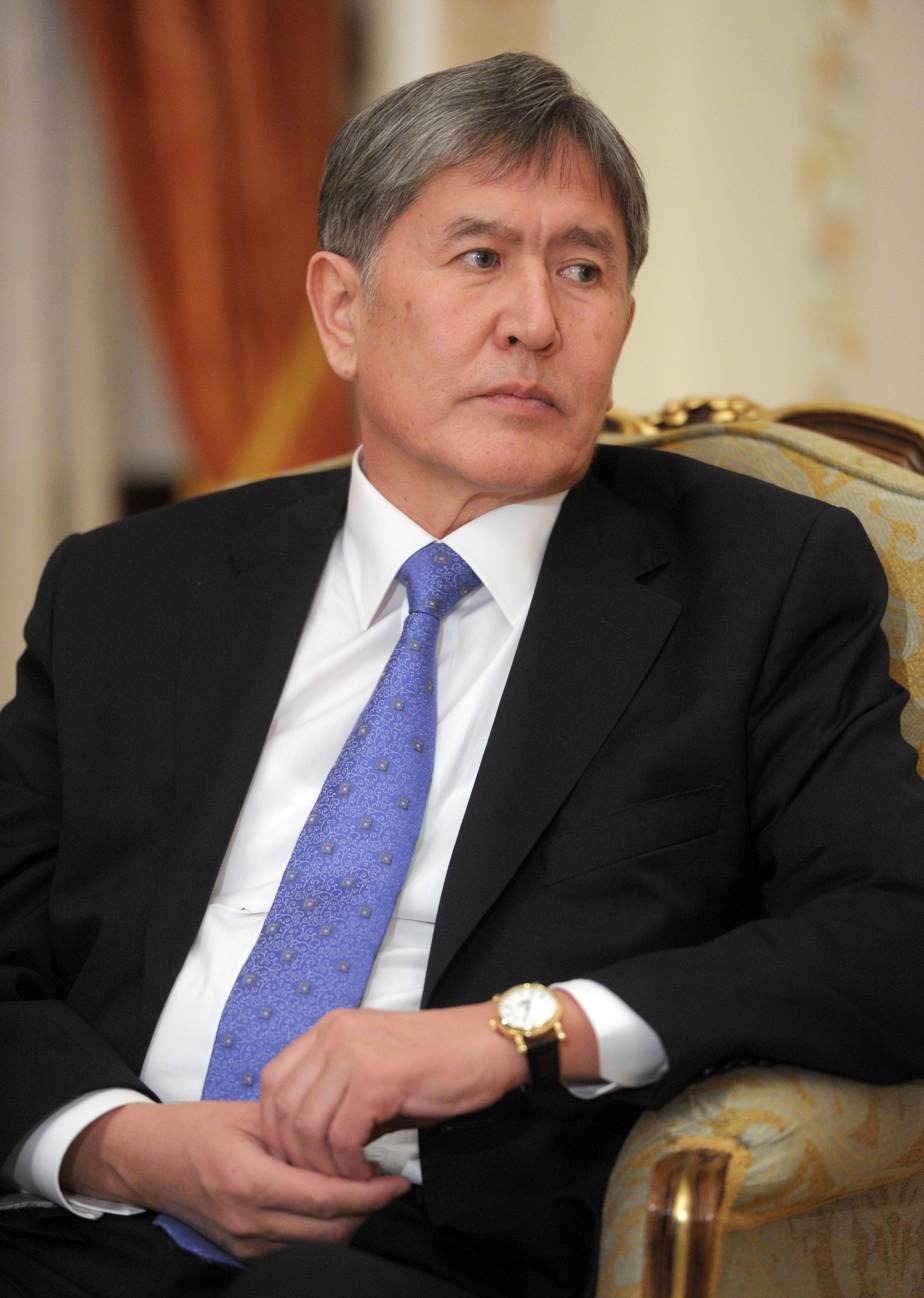
(Kyrgyzstan) Almazbek Atambayev
President of Kyrgyzstan

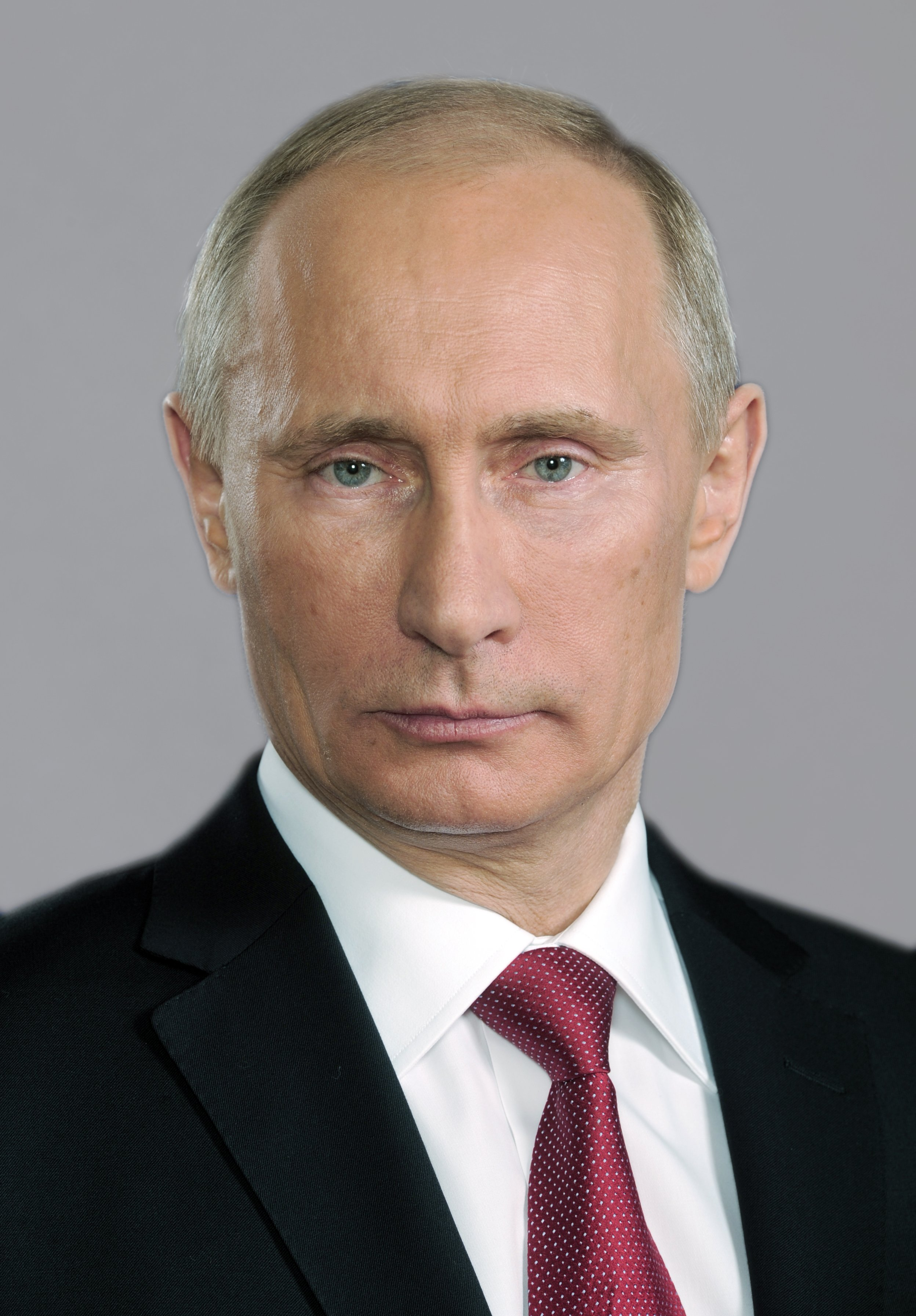
(Russia) Vladimir Putin
President of Russia

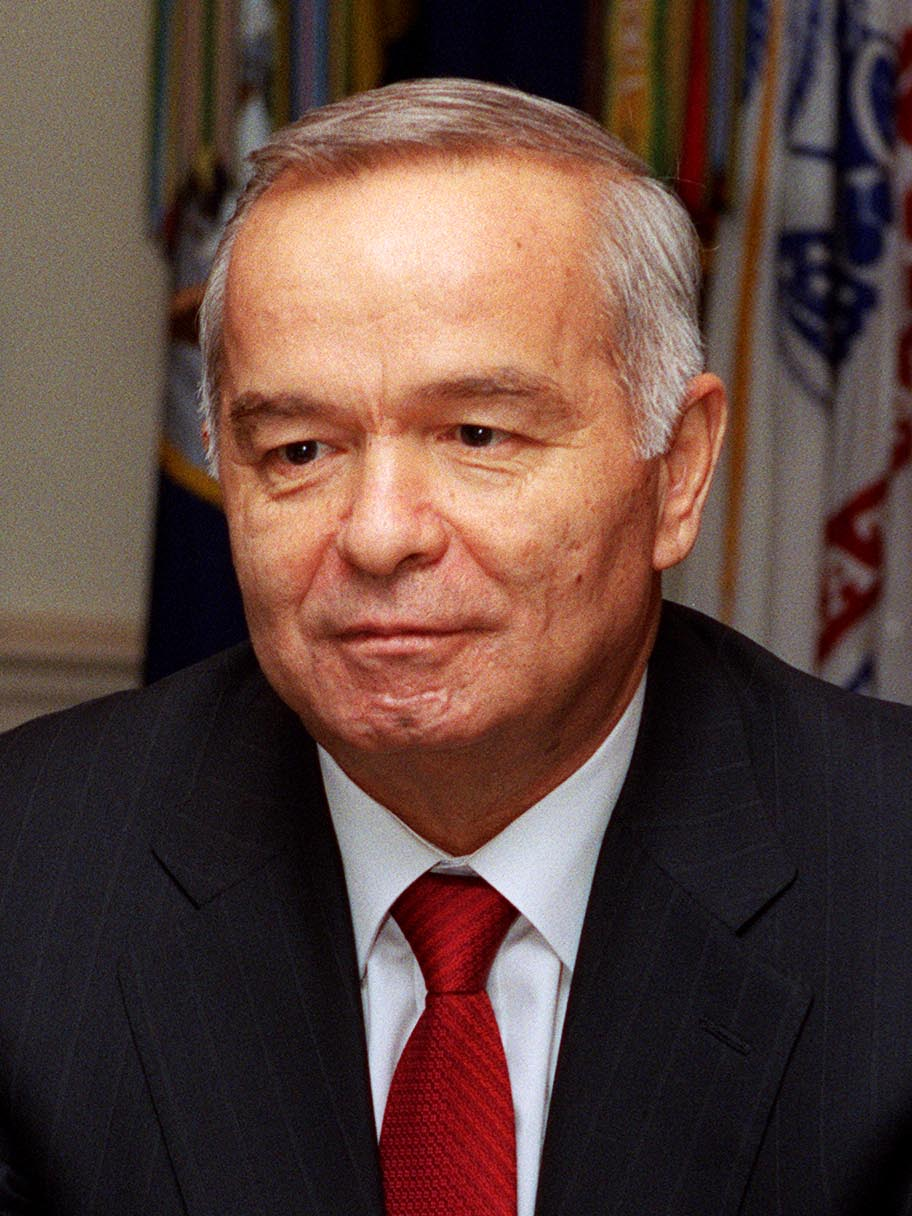
(Uzbekistan) Islam Karimov
President of Uzbekistan

The other state delegations are led by:

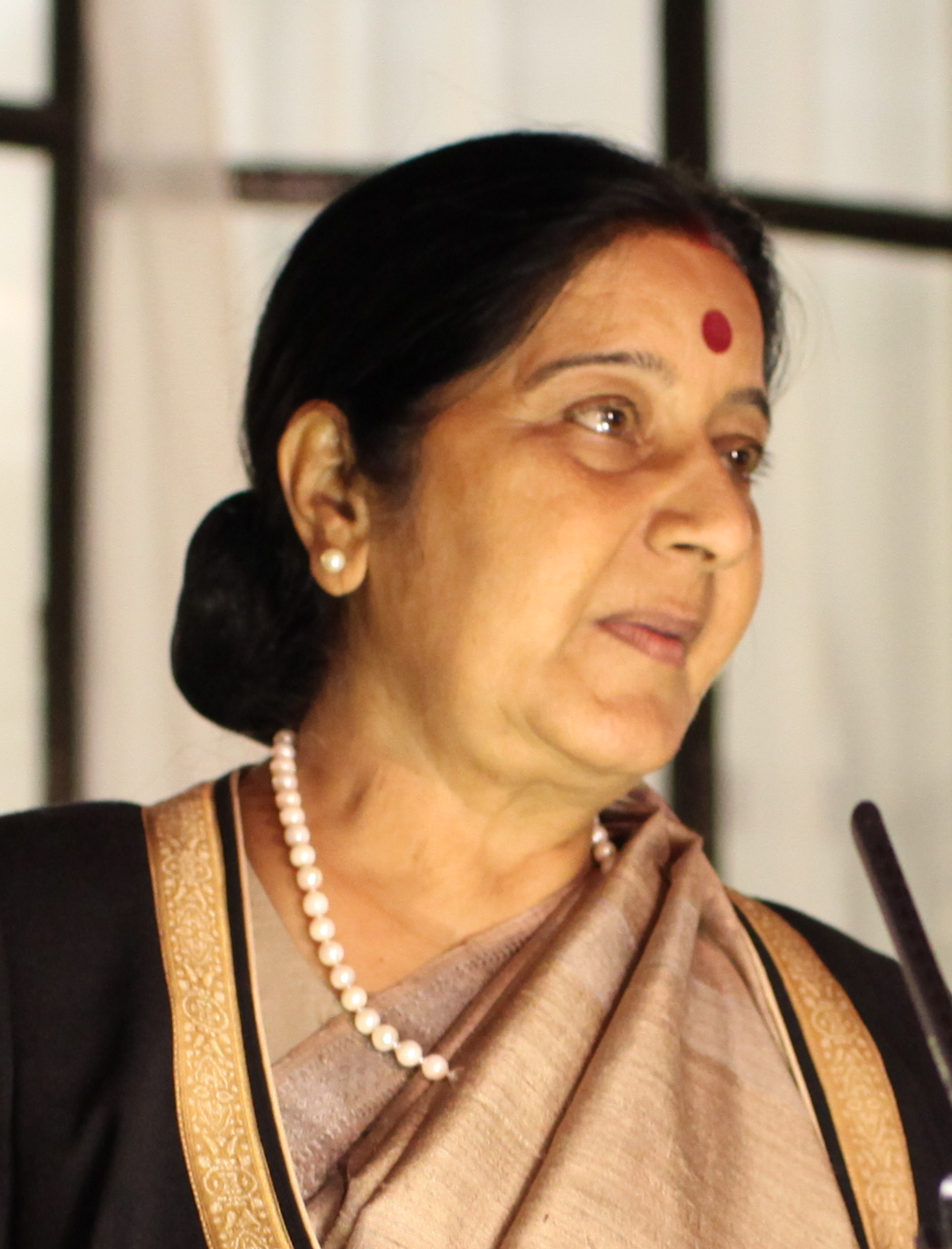
(India) Sushma Swaraj
Minister of External Affairs of India

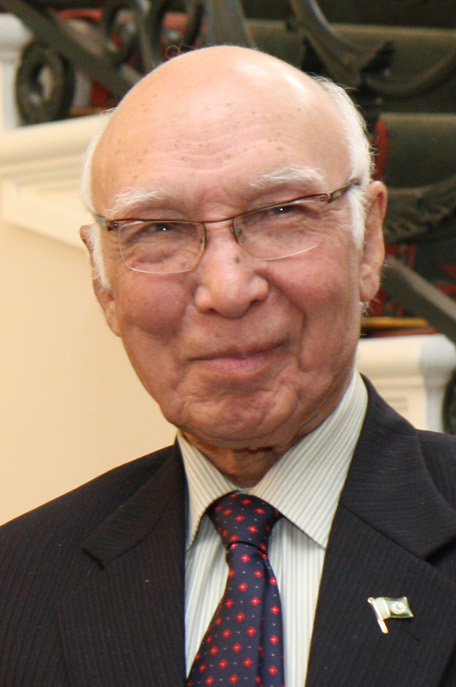
(Pakistan) Sartaj Aziz
National Security Adviser of Pakistan

== Agenda ==
India, Iran, Pakistan and Mongolia were due to become a full member at the 11–12 September summit, thereby upgrading their observer member status. The decision was made at the foreign ministers meeting earlier in the year. Indian Prime Minister Narendra Modi was told of China acceptance of expansion at the 6th BRICS summit.
