= Iran–Kazakhstan relations =

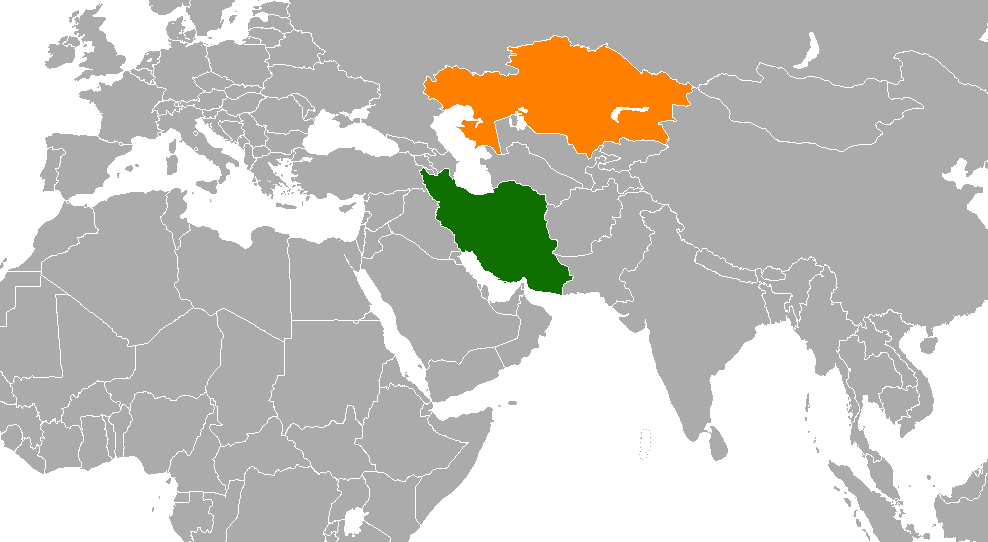

- Iran: Kazakhstan

Iran–Kazakhstan relations are the foreign relations and diplomatic ties between Iran and Kazakhstan.

Diplomatic relations between the two countries began on 29 January 1992. Kazakhstan's mission was set up in the Islamic Republic of Iran in 1993 with a consulate created in 2007 in Gorgan. As for Iran, they established an embassy in Kazakhstan in 1992 with two consulates created in 1992 in Aktau and in 2012 in Almaty.

== History ==
Historically, Kazakhstan and Iran shared ancient relations with Persian culture and influence introduced in Central Asia, and there were also period of sporadic conflict. Tomyris, Queen of Massagetae, was believed to be the one who killed Cyrus the Great, the Persian conqueror, and beheaded him in response to preserve the independence of Central Asia. Despite this, Persian influence persisted despite the advance of Islam to the region, creating a unique Turco-Persian tradition in the region.

== Trade ==
Trade turnover between the two countries increased fivefold in the last six years from $400 million to more than $2 billion in 2009.

Iran imports grain, oil products and metals from Kazakhstan. Iran is a partner in joint oil and gas projects including construction of a pipeline connecting Kazakhstan, Turkmenistan, and Iran (Persian Gulf) which will give Astana access to the Asian markets. Kazakhstan has special interests in Iranian investments in mechanical engineering, infrastructure, transport, telecommunications.

While the countries of Iran and Kazakhstan are extremely diverse, they have found common ground in working together as Asian countries. A large component of what ties them together is the fact that they both have borders on the Caspian Sea. The resources and access that comes from that resource is a link for their economics and resources. Such economic interests for the two countries revolve around oil whether it be underwater or subterranean. Also, in conversations in 2010 between high level Iranian and Kazakhstani officials there was discussions as to how well the two countries felt their relations were increasing. At that point in their relationship, Iran and Kazakhstan were looking to further develop their connection, especially through agriculture and transportation (air and rail).

Iran's commerce with numerous Central Asian countries grew in 2021. June 2022 Kazakh President Kassym-Jomart Tokayev visited Tehran.

Raisi and Tokayev unveiled a railway network that connects Kazakhstan with Iran and Turkey. The railway's goal is to make Kazakhstan's exports to Europe easier.

Iran could benefit from Kazakhstan's railway network in promoting the International North-South Transport Corridor trade route through Russia, Iran, and India. The countries want the corridor to compete with Egypt's Suez Canal. In a related development, Iran launched a commercial center in Russia last week in order to strengthen the corridor. The President of Kazakhstan has announced that the republic has taken a 14 -day trip for Iranian citizens without the need for a visa. He suggested that Iranian traders take advantage of this advantage. It aimed at attracting more Iranian businessmen and tourists.

== On-going commitment ==
The relationship of the two countries also evolved heavily through their mutual cooperation in international organizations. Some notable examples of relations in that field are through the United Nations (UN) and the Economic Cooperation Organization. Also, over 60 contracts since the diplomatic mission began are ensuring that Iran and Kazakhstan have legal and diplomatic obligations to each other.

Another facet to the relationship between Iran and Kazakhstan is that they seem committed to holding meetings and summits as to further their cooperation. The two countries, especially their leaders, have stressed that they feel a commitment to furthering the worth and strength of their currencies. Another way that they have expressed to the journalism community about ways to continue their strong relationship is through making visa requirements easier between the two countries, which they seem to feel would help increase the interests of Iranian and Kazakhstani business in the other respective country.

Kazakhstan's Prime Minister expressed their intention of expanding trade ties with Iran, during his meeting with the Iranian Minister of Agriculture in 2019, according to Fars News.

Since Central Asian country's independence from the Soviet Union, Iran has had cordial relations with Kazakhstan. Kazakhstan has aided Iran in particular through oil swap deals, which have allowed the Islamic Republic to avoid sanctions.

In recent years, economic and transit cooperation between Iran and Kazakhstan has been steadily increasing, with Bandar Abbas emerging as a key focal point for both countries as one of the main hubs of these interactions. Kazakhstan has announced plans to establish a logistics center in Bandar Abbas to enhance its access to the markets of Iran, the Persian Gulf, and Iraq via the North-South Corridor. Concurrently, the two countries have signed agreements on rail transportation that will permit the mutual passage of Iranian and Kazakh wagons, aiming to jointly transport up to five million tons of cargo annually along this route. This cooperation is part of broader efforts by both nations to develop transit networks and boost trade volumes. Economic analysts suggest that Kazakhstan's expanded presence in Bandar Abbas could revive the southern branch of the East-West Corridor, strengthen Iran's role in regional transit, and reinforce Bandar Abbas's position as a vital link between Central Asia and the markets of the Persian Gulf and South Asia.

== Iranian Ambassadors to Kazakhstan ==
1. Rasul Eslami; July 28, 1992 - September 3, 1996
2. Hasan Kashkavi; 26 September 1996 - 28 May 2000
3. Morteza Safari Natanzi; November 22, 2000 - October 18, 2004
4. Ramin Mehmanparast; March 15, 2005 - August 13, 2009
5. Gorban Seifi; March 30, 2010 - April 12, 2014
6. Moitaba Damirchilu; May 6, 2014 - August 22, 2018
7. Majid Samadzade Saber; since November 17, 2018.

== See also ==
- Foreign relations of Iran
- Foreign relations of Kazakhstan
