= Iran–Turkmenistan relations =

- Iran: Turkmenistan

Iran–Turkmenistan relations are the foreign relations between Iran and Turkmenistan. The two countries share a 1,148 km-long border and have long-standing historical ties.

Following Turkmenistan’s independence from the Soviet Union in 1991, the two countries have maintained friendly relations and established diplomatic relations in 1992. Since then, they have developed cooperation in various fields, including economics, transport, infrastructure development, and energy.

== History ==
Relations between Iran and Turkmenistan have developed over several centuries. The territory of present-day Turkmenistan was, since ancient times, within the sphere of influence of the Achaemenid Empire, and several Iranian or Iranic states such as the Parthian Empire and the Sasanian Empire ruled or exerted influence over the region. In addition, major routes of the Silk Road facilitated extensive economic and cultural exchange between the two regions.

During the medieval period, Turkic dynasties such as the Seljuk Empire and the Timurid Empire ruled over parts of Iran and Central Asia, leading to increased human and cultural interaction between the two regions. In this process, Persian culture and the Persian language had a major influence on the territory of present-day Turkmenistan, while Turkic peoples, including the Turkmen people, also played an important role in Iranian society and politics.

In the 19th century, the Russian Empire expanded into Central Asia, gradually bringing the territory of Turkmenistan under its control. As a result, direct political relations between Iran and the Turkmen region weakened, although trade and cultural exchange continued in border areas.

In 1924, with the establishment of the Turkmen Soviet Socialist Republic, relations between the two sides were effectively conducted within the broader framework of relations between Iran and the Soviet Union. During the Cold War, Iran and the Turkmen SSR shared a border and maintained limited economic and cross-border cooperation.

Following the dissolution of the Soviet Union in 1991 and Turkmenistan's independence, bilateral relations entered a new phase. Iran was among the first countries to establish diplomatic relations with Turkmenistan in 1992. The two countries subsequently expanded cooperation in areas such as economics, transport, energy, and infrastructure development. They have implemented joint projects including natural gas transit, railway links, and road construction, and have also cooperated on building transport corridors connecting Central Asia and the Persian Gulf.

In the 21st century, the two countries have continued to maintain cooperation, particularly in the energy and transport sectors, while engaging in ongoing discussions aimed at ensuring stability in the Caspian Sea region and promoting regional economic integration.

== Trade ==
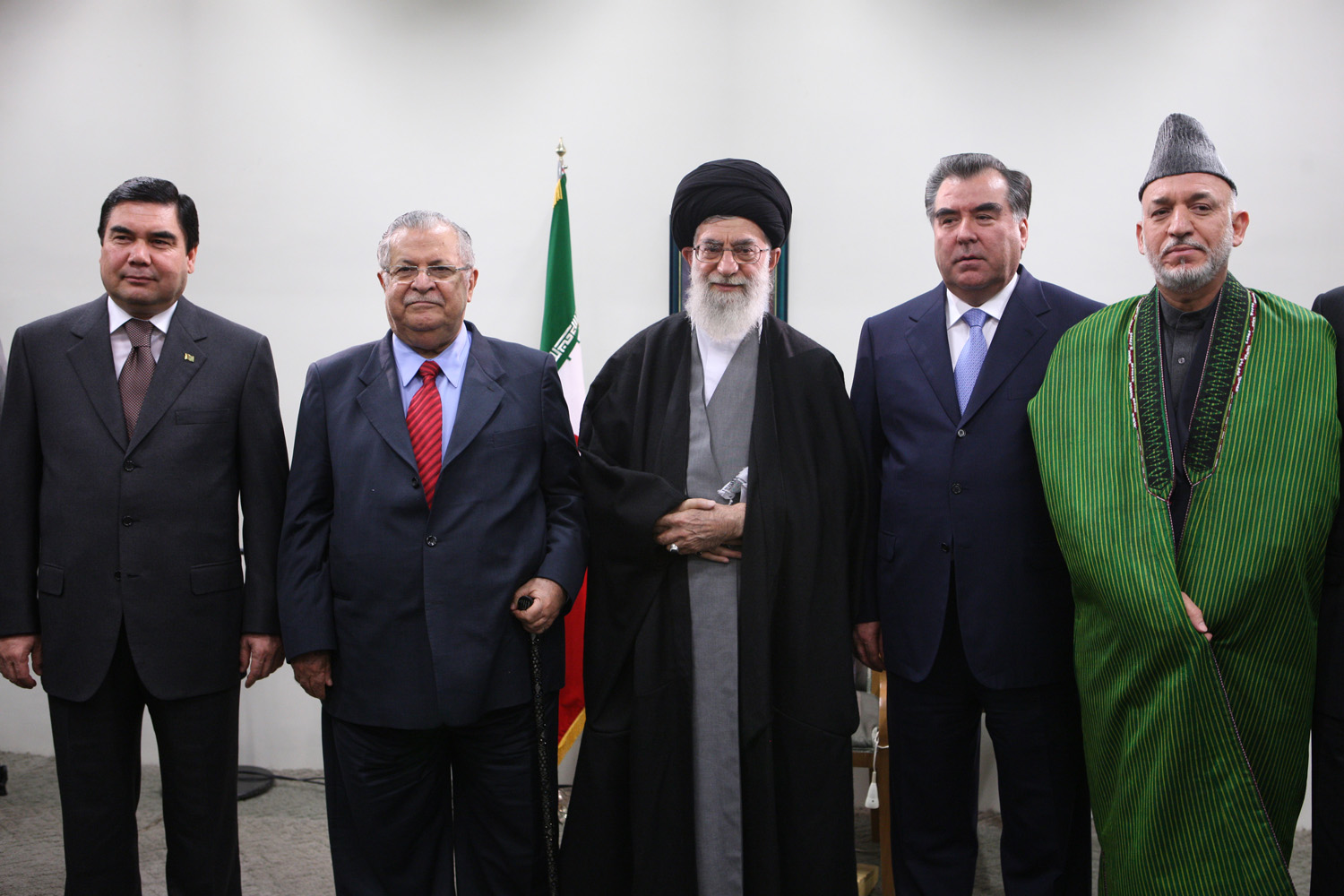
Meetings of Presidents that participated in Nowruz in Tehran, Iran, 2010.

Iran has the second-largest volume of trade exchange with Turkmenistan, behind Russia. The Tajan-Mashhad-Sarakhs railroad, the $139 million Korpeje-Kurt Kui gas pipeline in western Turkmenistan and the $167 million Dousti ('Friendship' in Persian) Dam in the south of the country were built through a joint venture. Balkanabad-Aliabad power transfer line and several other projects such as the program of fiber-optic communications development, construction of bunkers and other objects in Merve and a refinery in Turkmenbashi, construction of liquefied gas terminals, highways are instances of growing bilateral relations. In 2009 about 100 industrial projects have been built or are being built in Turkmenistan with Iranian help.

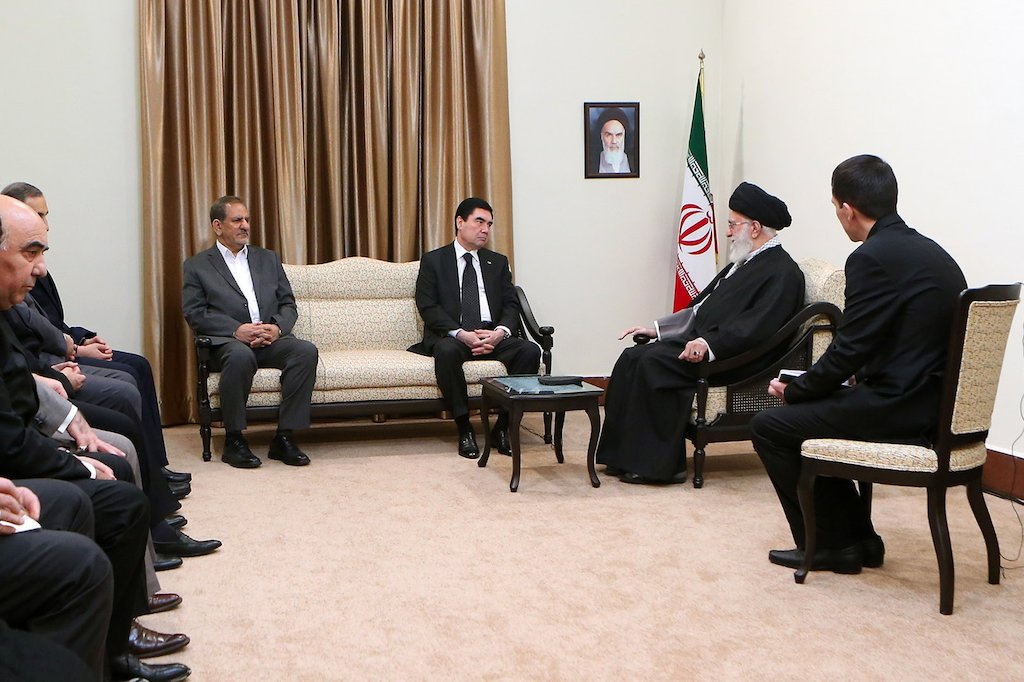
Iran's Supreme Leader Ali Khamenei in a meeting with visiting Turkmen President Gurbanguly Berdimuhamedow, 2015.

Annual trade turnover decreased to $1.2 billion in 2009 from $3.2 billion in 2008 mostly because of decrease in the price of oil and gas. Turkmenistan's exports to Iran increased by 42 percent during January–September 2007. Turkmenistan normally supplies 5 percent of Iran's gas demand.

On November 28, 2021, Iran, Turkmenistan and Azerbaijan have signed a gas swap deal for up to 2 billion cubic metres, per year.Turkmenistan will sell 5-6 million cubic metres of gas per day to Azerbaijan under the trilateral agreement signed in Turkmenistan.Iran will also withdraw its gas consumption needs in five provinces of the country from the right to transfer this gas. Iran was moving to resolve a lingering gas debt dispute with Central Asia's Turkmenistan, which said in late 2017 that it was owed $1.8 billion in payments for gas delivered to Tehran.

== Transportation ==
=== Railway ===
The Kazakhstan-Turkmenistan-Iran railway link is a part of the North–South Transport Corridor and is a 677 km (421 mi) long railway line connecting Kazakhstan and Turkmenistan with Iran and the Persian Gulf. It links Uzen in Kazakhstan with Bereket - Etrek in Turkmenistan and ends at Gorgan in Iran's Golestan province. In Iran, the railway will be linked to national network making its way to the ports of the Persian Gulf.

This project is part of the Ashgabat Agreement, which is a Multimodal transport agreement signed by India, Oman, Iran, Turkmenistan, Uzbekistan and Kazakhstan, for creating an international transport and transit corridor facilitating transportation of goods between Central Asia and the Persian Gulf.

The project is estimated to cost $620m which is being jointly funded by the governments of Kazakhstan, Turkmenistan and Iran.

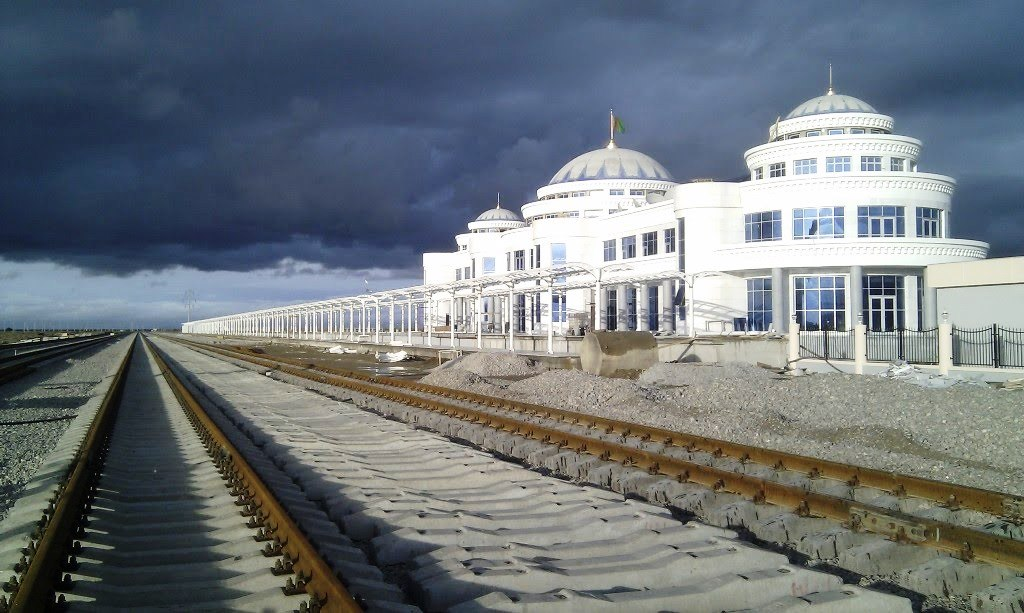
Bereket city is an important crossroad of the Trans-Caspian Railway and North-South Transnational Railway.

The project also aims to create a multimodal transport system to provide seamless connectivity in the region for passenger travel as well. The North-South Transnational Corridor will run up to 137 km (85 mi) in Kazakhstan, 470 km (292 mi) in Turkmenistan and 70 km (43 mi) in Iran.

Work in Turkmenistan commenced in Bereket in December 2007 and in Kazakhstan in July 2009.

A 311 km (193 mi) section between Bereket and Buzhan in Turkmenistan is being financed by the Asian Development Bank (ADB). A memorandum of understanding was signed between ADB and the Turkmenistan government in February 2010, for a $350m loan as a special fund for technical assistance. The project loan was for the installation of signalling and communication equipment on the ongoing railway line, procurement of equipment and maintenance facilities, consulting, and for the management and supervision of construction. The project also received a loan of $371.2m from the Islamic Development Bank in July 2010.

In May 2013, a 311 km (193 mi) Bereket – Uzen section of the 677 km (421 mi) North-South Railway Corridor was completed. In February 2014, 256 km (159 mi) long section between Bereket and Etrek was completed. Currently railway stations along the new railway are being constructed.

The Kazakhstan-Turkmenistan-Iran railway link was officially inaugurated in October 2014.

Bereket city (Kazandzhik) is strategically important railway intersection of the Trans-Caspian Railway (Caspian Sea, Turkmenistan, Uzbekistan and eastern Kazakhstan) and North-South Transnational Railway. The city has a large locomotive repair depot and a modern passenger railway station.

== Import gas from Turkmenistan and swap agreement ==
Two countries are both among the biggest natural gas producers in the world. Despite its major natural gas fields in the south, Iran has imported gas from Turkmenistan since 1997, especially for domestic use in its northern provinces during winter and for swap transfer purposes. Under a swap agreement, Iran currently imports 5-6 million cubic meters per day of natural gas for domestic consumption from the northeastern neighbor while exporting the same amount from its own natural gas supply to Azerbaijan in Iran's northwest.

== See also ==
- Foreign relations of Iran
- Foreign relations of Turkmenistan
- Iran-Turkmenistan border
- Treaty of Akhal
