= 5th BRICS summit =

2013 international summit in Durban, South Africa

5th BRICS Summit
- 26–27 March 2013

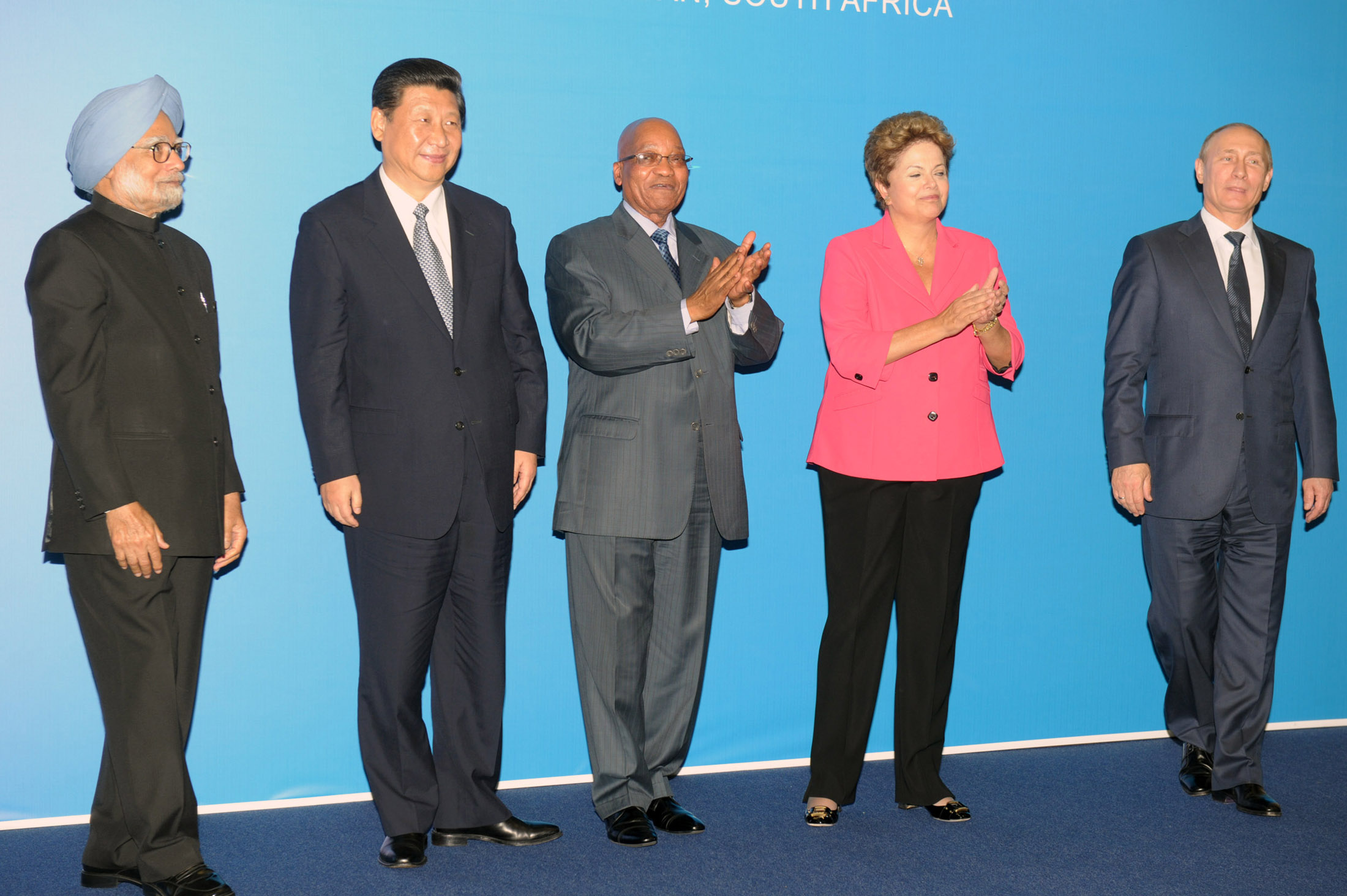
- Host country: South Africa
- Cities: Durban
- Venues: Durban ICC
- Participants: Brazil; Russia; India; China; South Africa
- Website: www.brics5.co.za

The 2013 BRICS summit was the fifth annual BRICS summit, an international relations conference attended by the head of states or heads of government of the five member states Brazil, Russia, India, China and South Africa. The summit was held in Durban, South Africa in 2013. This completed the first round of BRICS summits.

== Background ==
A declaration at the end of 2012 BRICS summit read that: "Brazil, Russia, India and China thank South Africa for the proposal to host the 5th summit in 2013. They intend to provide multifaceted support for it." The BRICS leaders are expected to discuss the establishment of a new development bank. According to Mikhail Margelov they will seek agreement on the amount of starting capital.

== Participants ==
China's Xi Jinping made this the first summit of his general secretaryship of the CCP since 2012.

The heads of state/heads of government of the five countries that participated in the summit were:

**Core BRICS members** Host state and leader are shown in bold text.
Member		Represented by	Title
(Brazil)	Brazil	Dilma Rousseff	President
(Russia)	Russia	Vladimir Putin	President
(India)	India	Manmohan Singh	Prime Minister
(China)	China	Xi Jinping	CCP General Secretary and President
(South Africa)	**South Africa**	**Jacob Zuma**	**President**

== Gallery of participating leaders ==
Members:

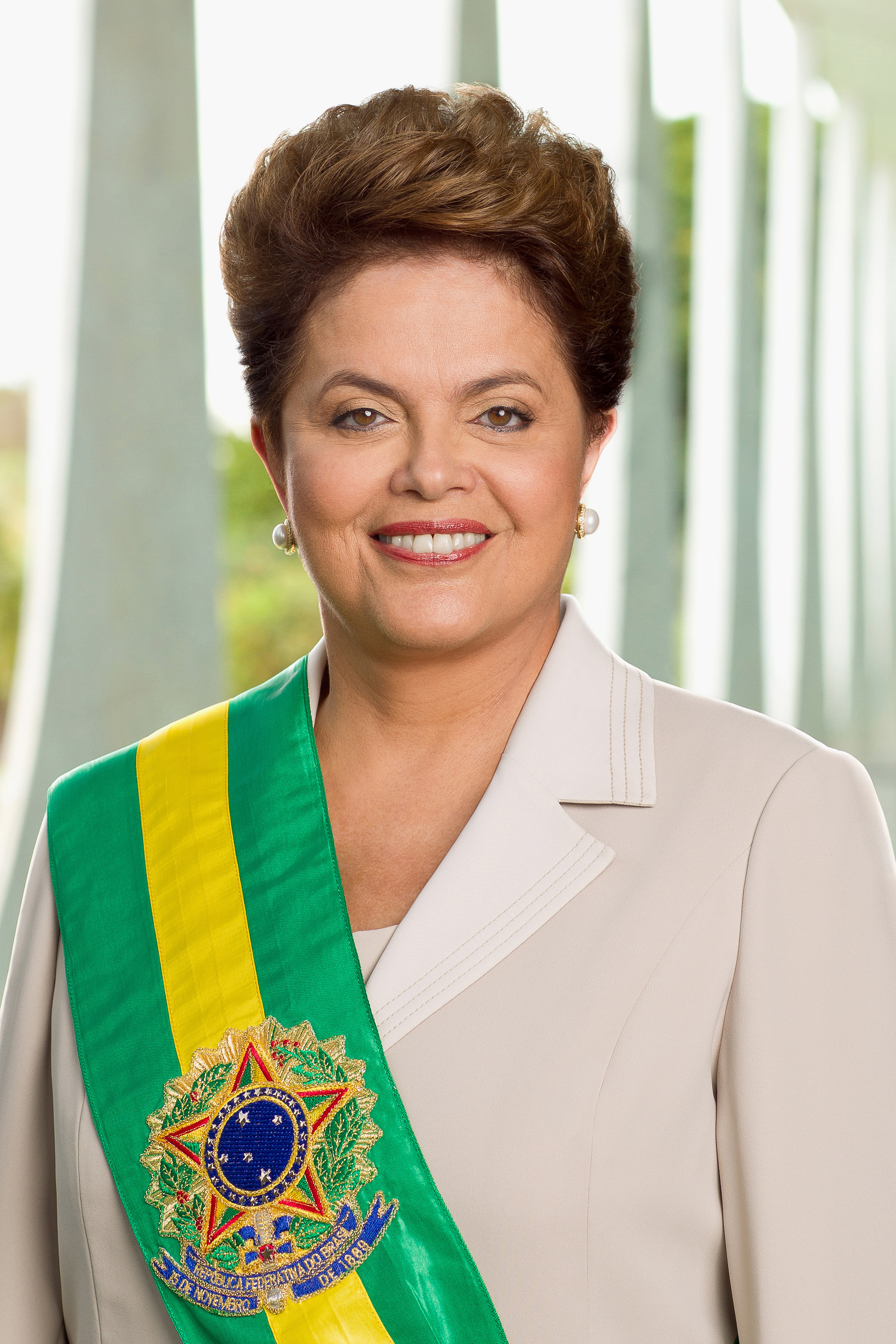
**Brazil**
Dilma Rousseff, President

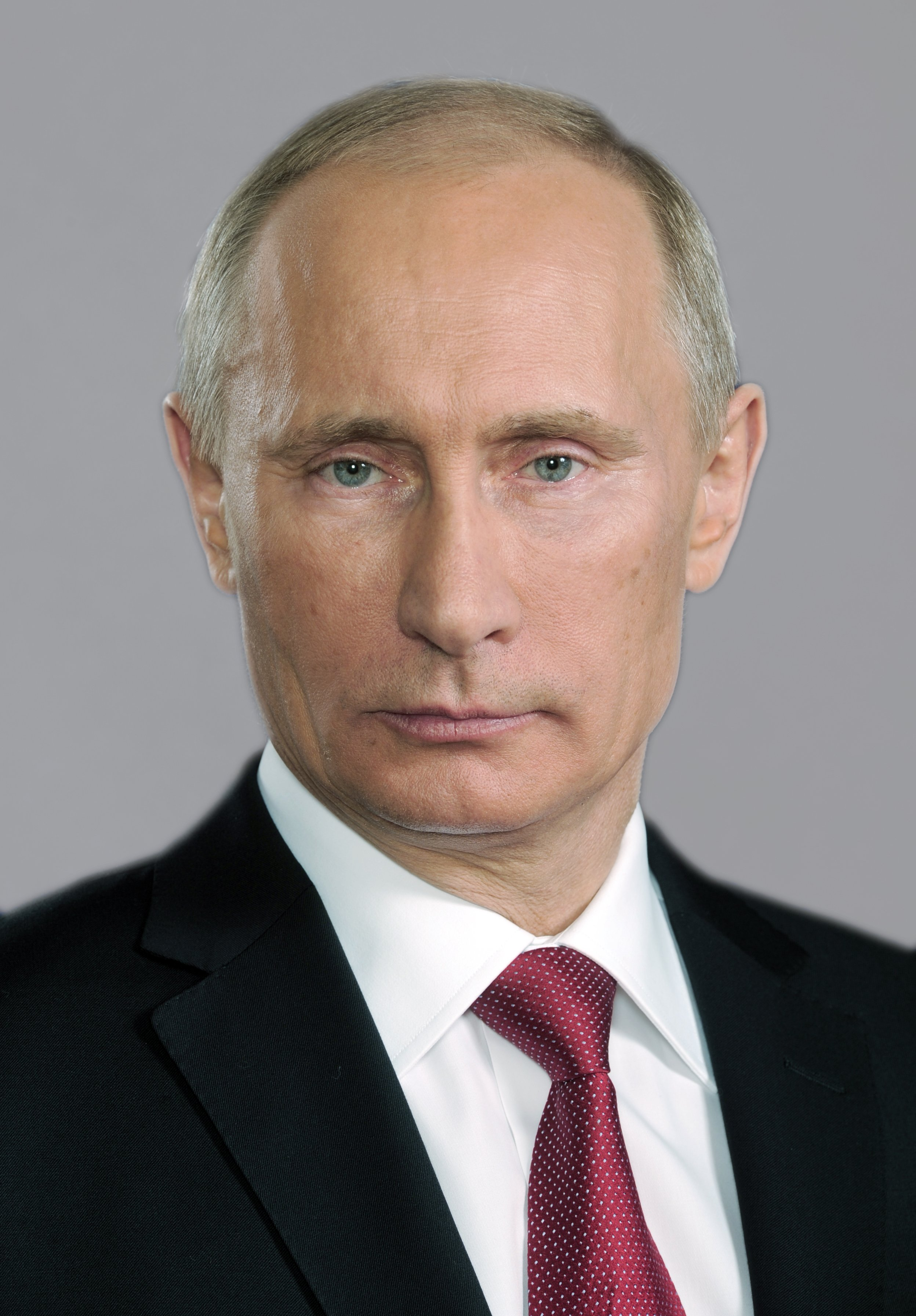
**Russia**
Vladimir Putin, President

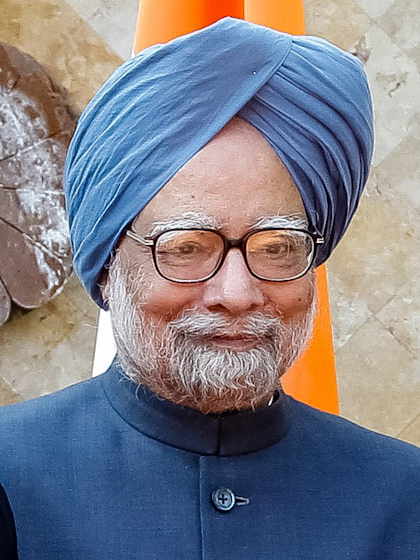
**India**
Manmohan Singh, Prime Minister

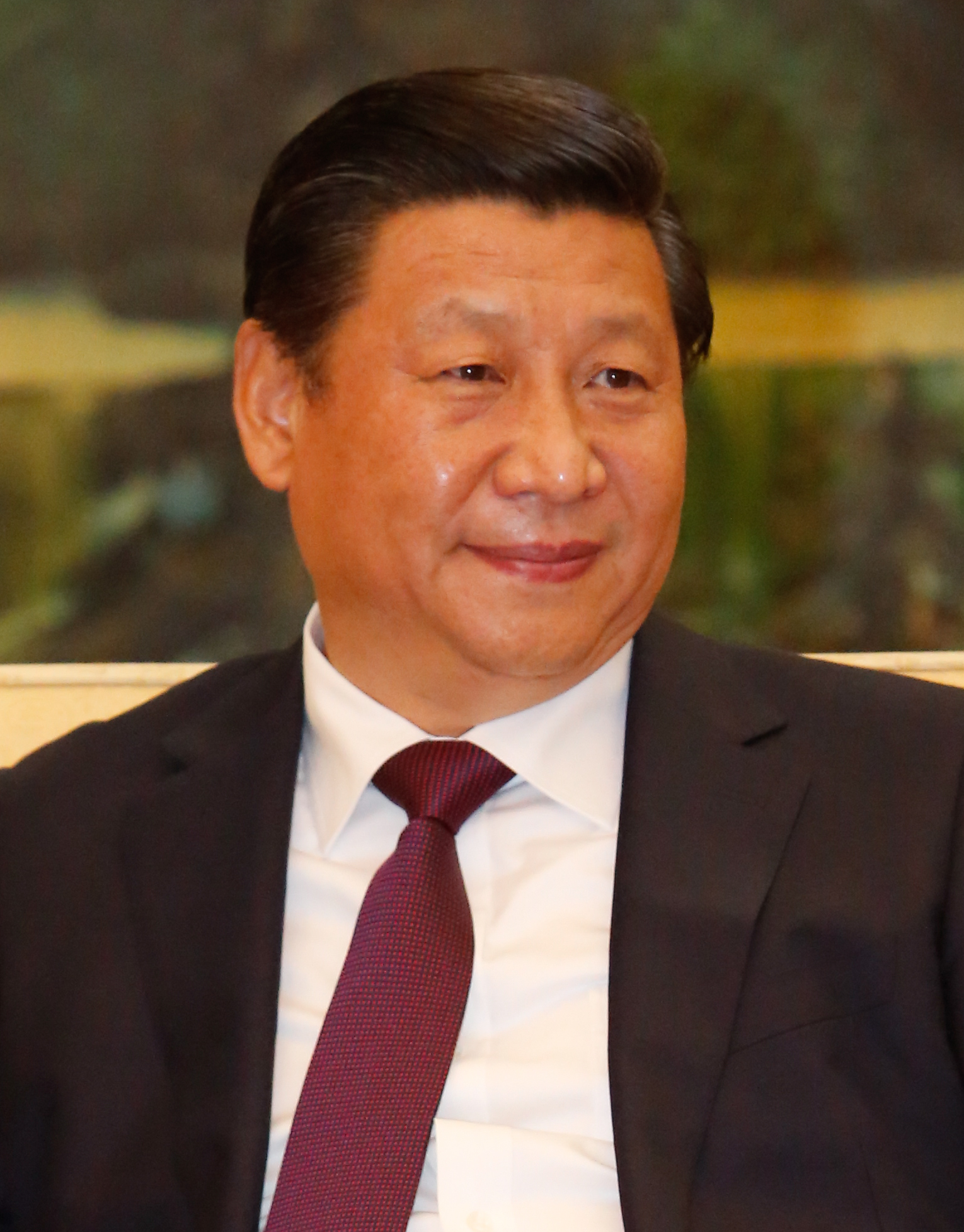
**China**
Xi Jinping, CCP General Secretary and President

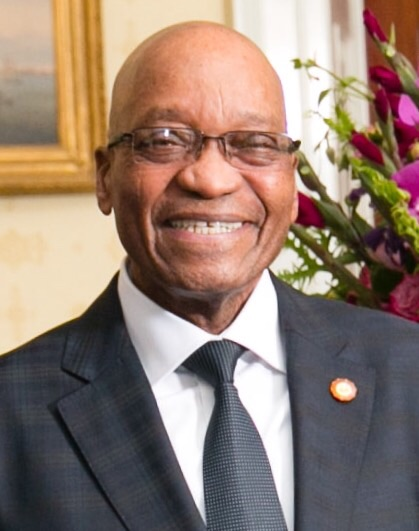
**South Africa**
**Jacob Zuma, President (Host)**

== Discussions ==
The summit commenced on 26 March at 17:30 GMT. Amongst the important issues being discussed was the creation of the development bank as a follow-up from the previous summit. It sought to create an infrastructure-focused bank. The disputes over the bank were in regards to what it would do and how it would provide an equitable return on the initial investment of about US$100bn.

=== Reactions ===
Host President Jacob Zuma said the summit could address South Africa's economic problems, such as high unemployment. He added: "BRICS provides an opportunity for South Africa to promote its competitiveness. It is an opportunity to move further in our drive to promote economic growth and confront the challenge of poverty, inequality and unemployment that afflicts our country. "

Daniel Twining of the German Marshall Fund said: "Ironically it may be the cleavages within the BRICS grouping that more accurately hint at the future of the global order: tensions between China and Brazil on trade, India on security, and Russia on status highlight the difficulty Beijing will have in staking its claim to global leadership." The media suggested the bank was way to bypass the IMF and the World Bank. Despite high hopes for the 2013 summit, BRICS was not as involved as they had planned to be.
