= Leonid Bokhanovsky =

Russian energy executive

- Occupation: Energy executive
- Known for: Secretary General of the Gas Exporting Countries Forum (2009–2013)

Leonid Bokhanovsky is a Russian energy executive and former Secretary General of the Gas Exporting Countries Forum (GECF), an international organization headquartered in Doha, Qatar.

== Career ==
Before joining the GECF, Bokhanovsky served as the first vice-president of Stroytransgaz, a Russian engineering and construction firm specializing in pipeline infrastructure. The company was indirectly linked to Russian oil trader Gennady Timchenko, a known ally of then-Prime Minister Vladimir Putin.

In December 2009, Bokhanovsky was elected as the first Secretary General of the GECF during a ministerial meeting held in Doha.

His appointment followed lobbying efforts by the Russian government to secure greater influence within the organization, which groups major natural gas exporting countries such as Russia, Iran, Qatar, and Algeria. The appointment marked Russia’s growing leadership role within the forum, which collectively controls the majority of the world’s proven gas reserves.

Bokhanovsky’s tenure lasted from 2009 until the end of 2013. During this period, he promoted coordinated investment policies among member countries and advocated maintaining the link between natural gas prices and oil in long-term contracts, a stance that drew criticism from consumer countries and the International Energy Agency.

He also encouraged the expansion of GECF membership and positioned the forum as a potential counterbalance to OPEC, although he stopped short of calling for production quotas or supply cuts.

Bokhanovsky concluded his term in 2013 and was formally thanked by the Emir of Qatar for his service.
