= List of international presidential trips made by Abdelmadjid Tebboune =

Visits by the president of Algeria since 2019

This is a list of international presidential trips made by Abdelmadjid Tebboune, the 8th President of Algeria, since taking office on 19 December 2019.

== 2020 ==
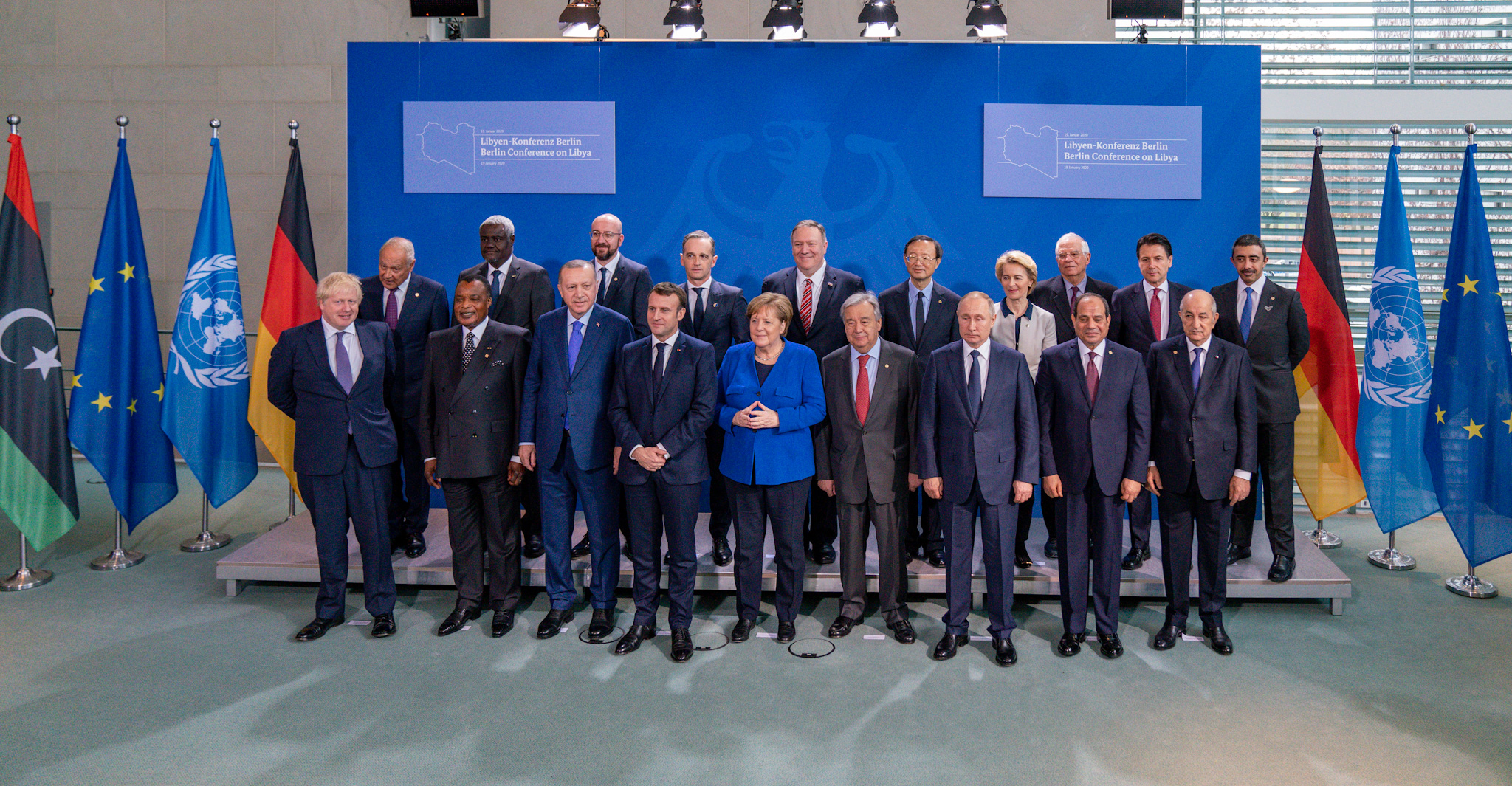
Tebboune at the Libya Summit in Berlin (January 19, 2020)

Country	Areas visited	Date(s)	Notes
Germany	Berlin	19 January	Attended the Berlin Conference on Libya.
Saudi Arabia	Riyadh, Medina	26–28 February	State visit. Met with Crown Prince Mohammed bin Salman and visited the Prophet's Mosque.

== 2021 ==
Country	Areas visited	Date(s)	Notes
Tunisia	Tunis	15–16 December	State visit. Met with President Kais Saied.

== 2022 ==
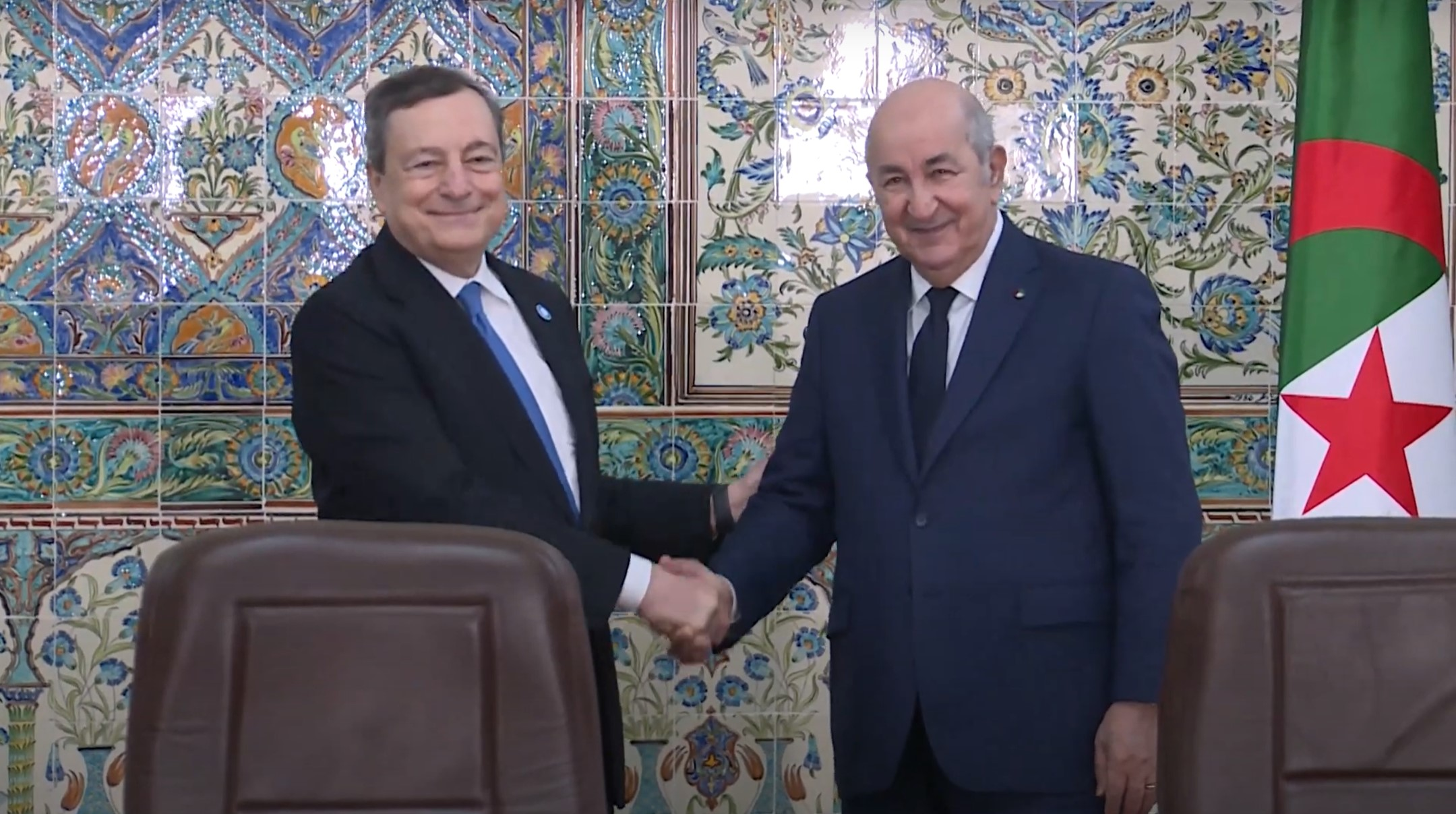
Tebboune with Italian Prime Minister Mario Draghi, 11 April 2022

Country	Areas visited	Date(s)	Notes
Egypt	Cairo	24–25 January	Working and fraternal visit. Met with President Abdel Fattah el-Sisi.
Qatar	Doha	19–21 February	State visit. Met with Emir Tamim bin Hamad Al Thani and attended the 6th Gas Exporting Countries Forum (GECF) summit.
Turkey	Ankara	15–17 May	State visit. Co-chaired the High-Level Cooperation Council with President Recep Tayyip Erdoğan.
Italy	Rome	25–27 May	State visit. Met with President Sergio Mattarella and Prime Minister Mario Draghi.

== 2023 ==
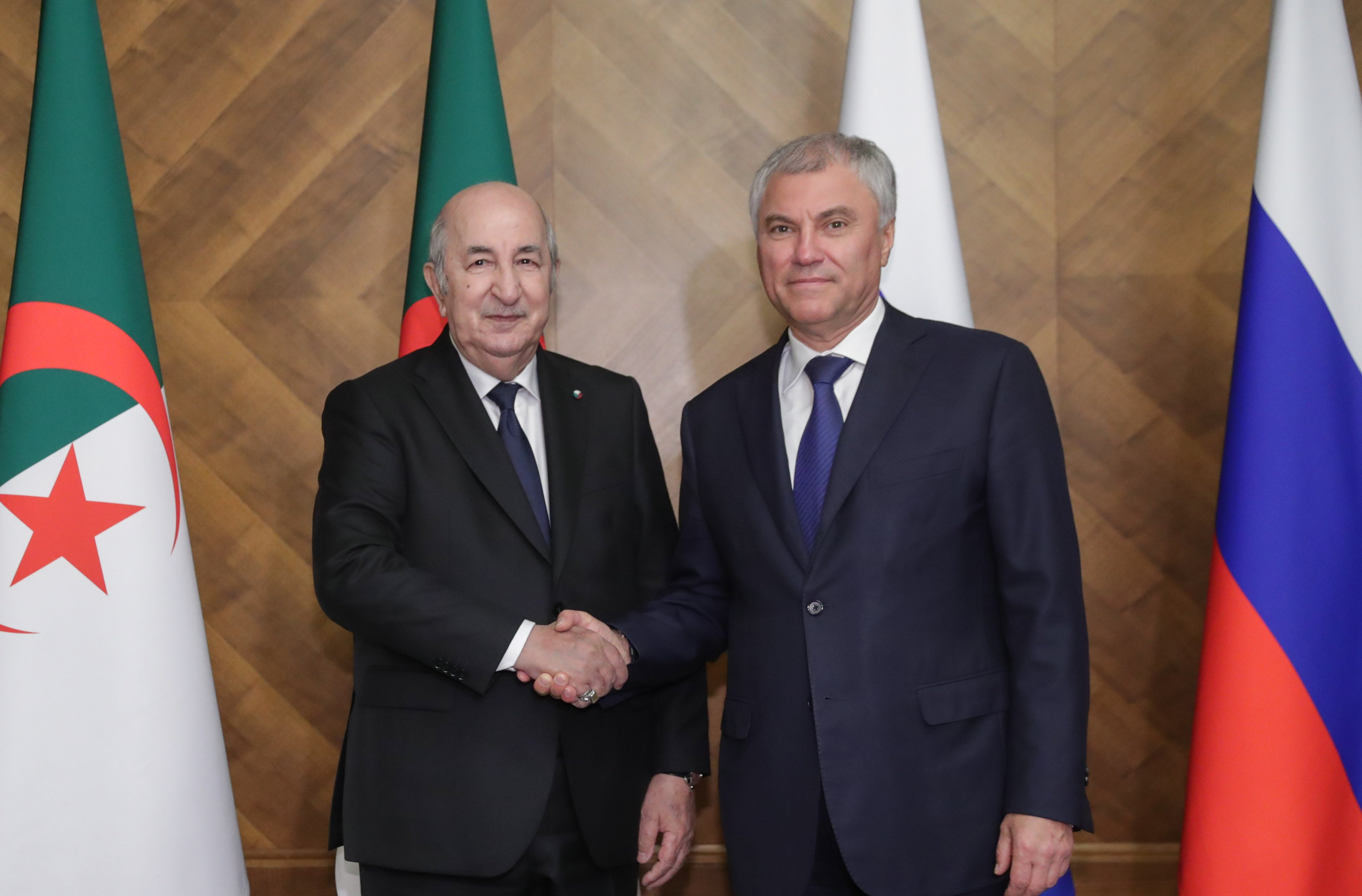
Tebboune with Vladimir Putin's close associate Vyacheslav Volodin in Moscow, Russia on 14 June 2023

Country	Areas visited	Date(s)	Notes
Portugal	Lisbon	22–23 May	State visit. Met with President Marcelo Rebelo de Sousa and Prime Minister António Costa. Received the Key to the City of Lisbon.
Russia	Moscow, Saint Petersburg	13–16 June	State visit. Met with President Vladimir Putin and attended the St. Petersburg International Economic Forum.
Qatar	Doha	15–16 July	Working visit. Met with Emir Tamim bin Hamad Al Thani during transit to China.
China	Beijing, Shenzhen	17–21 July	State visit. Met with President Xi Jinping and Premier Li Qiang.
Turkey	Istanbul	21–22 July	Working visit. Met with President Recep Tayyip Erdoğan.
United States	New York City	17–21 September	Attended the 78th session of the United Nations General Assembly.

== 2024 ==
Country	Areas visited	Date(s)	Notes
Italy	Bari	13–15 June	Attended the 50th G7 summit at the invitation of Prime Minister Giorgia Meloni.
Egypt	Cairo	27–28 October	Working and fraternal visit. Met with President Abdel Fattah el-Sisi.
Oman	Muscat	28–30 October	State visit. Met with Sultan Haitham bin Tarik.

== 2025 ==
Country	Areas visited	Date(s)	Notes
Italy	Rome	22–24 July	Official visit. Co-chaired the 5th High-Level Algerian-Italian Intergovernmental Summit with Prime Minister Giorgia Meloni and met with President Sergio Mattarella.
Vatican City	Vatican City	24 July	Official visit. Met with Pope Leo XIV and Holy See Secretary of State Pietro Parolin.

== 2026 ==
Country	Areas visited	Date(s)	Notes
Turkey	Ankara	6–8 May	Official visit. Co-chaired the 1st Türkiye–Algeria High-Level Strategic Cooperation Council with President Recep Tayyip Erdoğan.
Germany	Berlin	15–17 July	Official visit. Met with President Frank-Walter Steinmeier and Chancellor Friedrich Merz.
Turkey	Antalya	12 November	Attended the 2026 United Nations Climate Change Conference (COP31).
