= Third GECF summit =

2015 GECF summit 3rd GECF summit
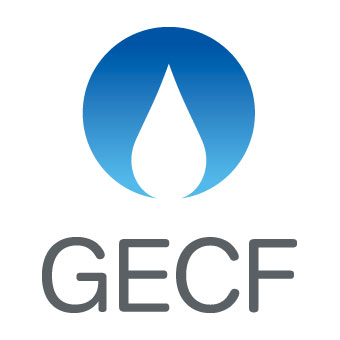
- Host country: Iran
- Date: 22–23 November 2015
- Cities: Chamran Expressway, Tehran
- Venues: Ejlas Saran Hall
- Participants: GECF
- Chair: Mohammad-Hossein Adeli
- Follows: 2nd GECF summit
- Precedes: 4th GECF summit
- Website: Third GECF Gas Summit

The 3rd GECF summit was a biennial Gas Exporting Countries Forum summit, an international relations conference attended by the heads of state or heads of government of most member states of the GECF. The summit was held in Tehran, Iran, the first time the city has hosted the summit. Iran assumed the chair of the GECF from Russia on 1 January 2014.

== Background ==
The summit was announced during the first meeting of the High-Level Ad Hoc Group for the 3rd Gas Summit on 20 May 2015. The group also discussed the draft summit declaration and other issues.

== Participating leaders ==
Full members:

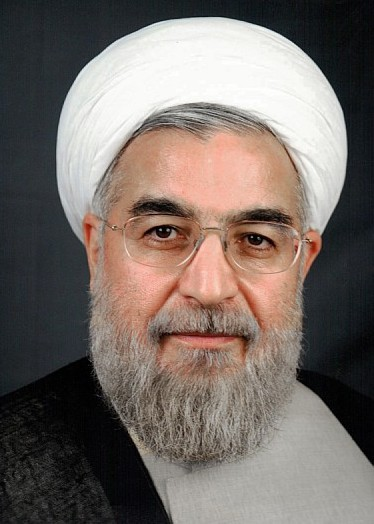
Iran
Hassan Rouhani, President (Host)

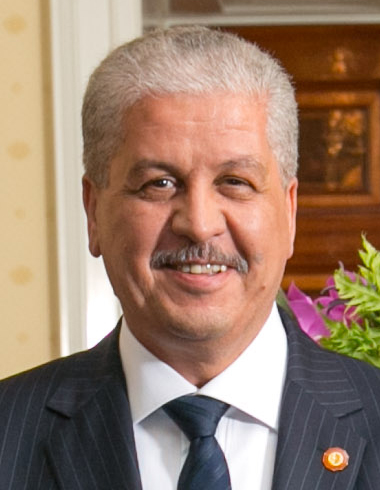
Algeria
Abdelmalek Sellal, Prime Minister

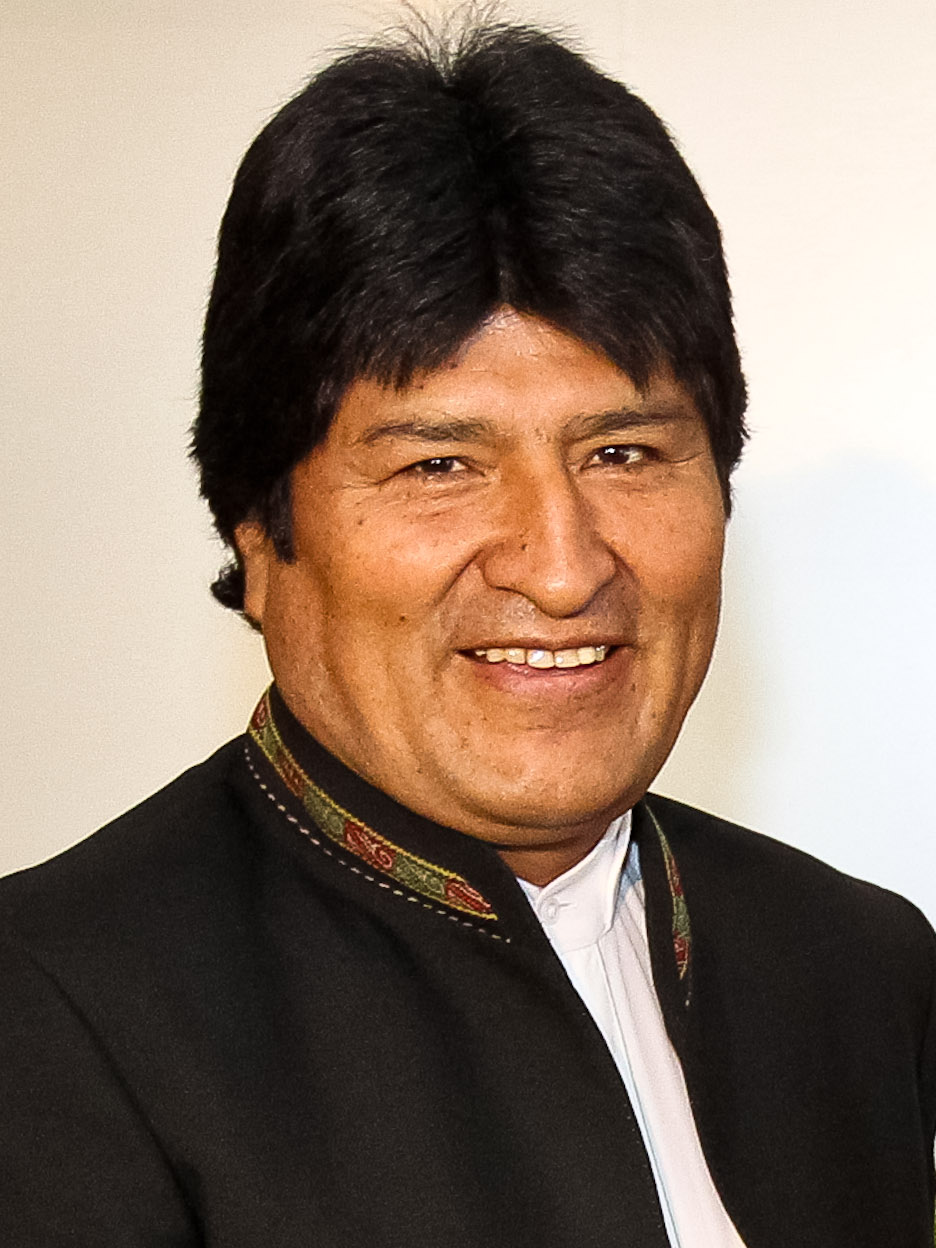
Bolivia
Evo Morales, President

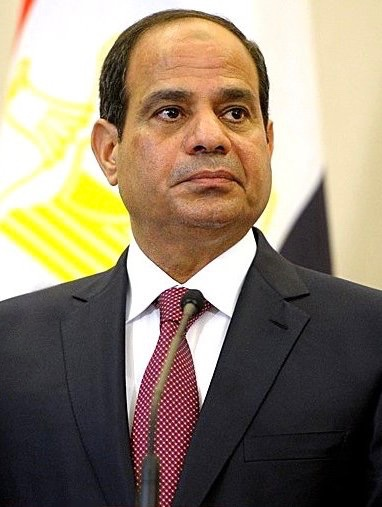
Egypt
Abdel Fattah el-Sisi, President

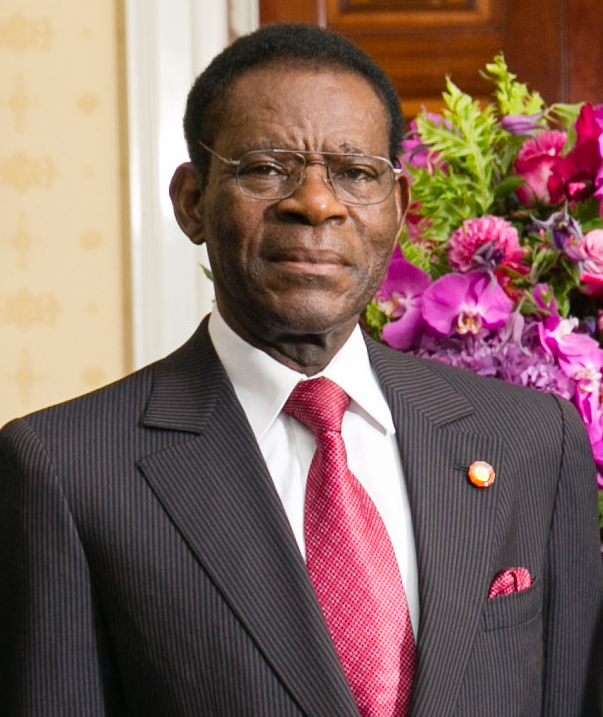
Equatorial Guinea
Teodoro Obiang Nguema Mbasogo, President

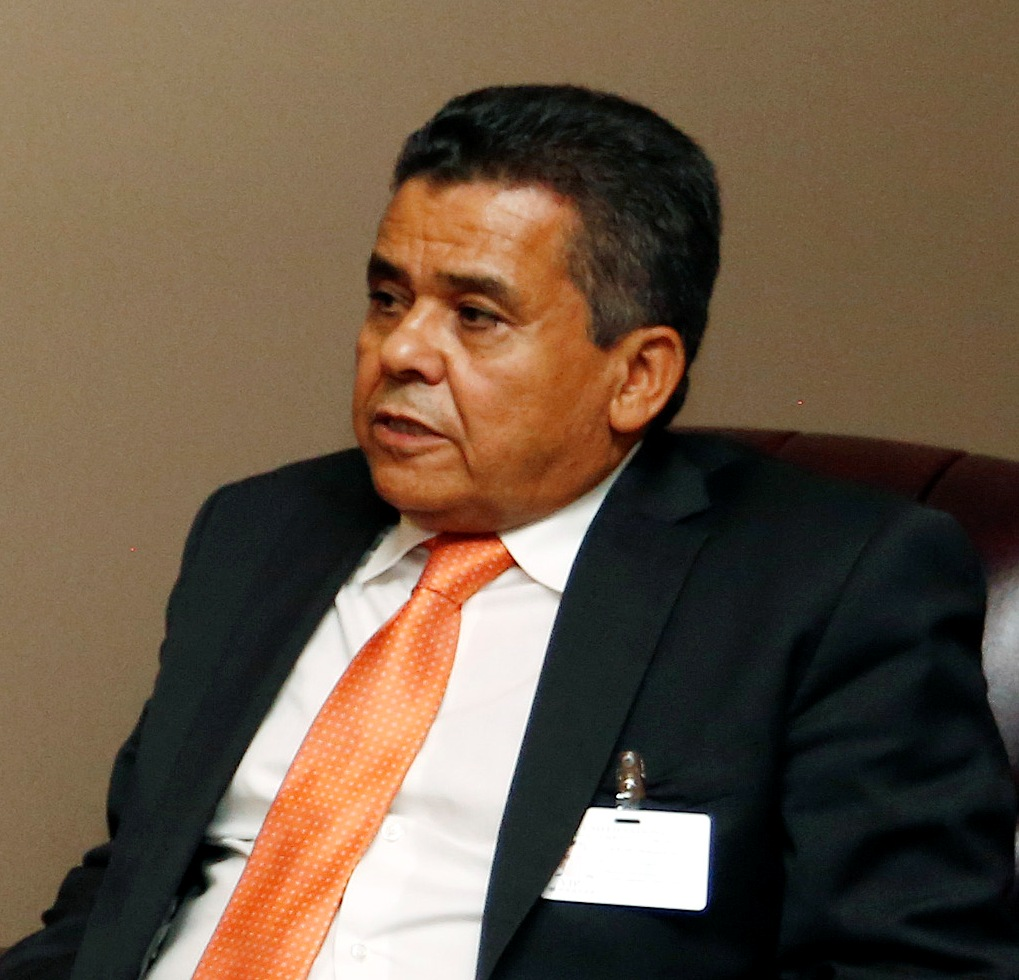
Libya
Mohammed al-Dairi, Minister of Foreign Affairs

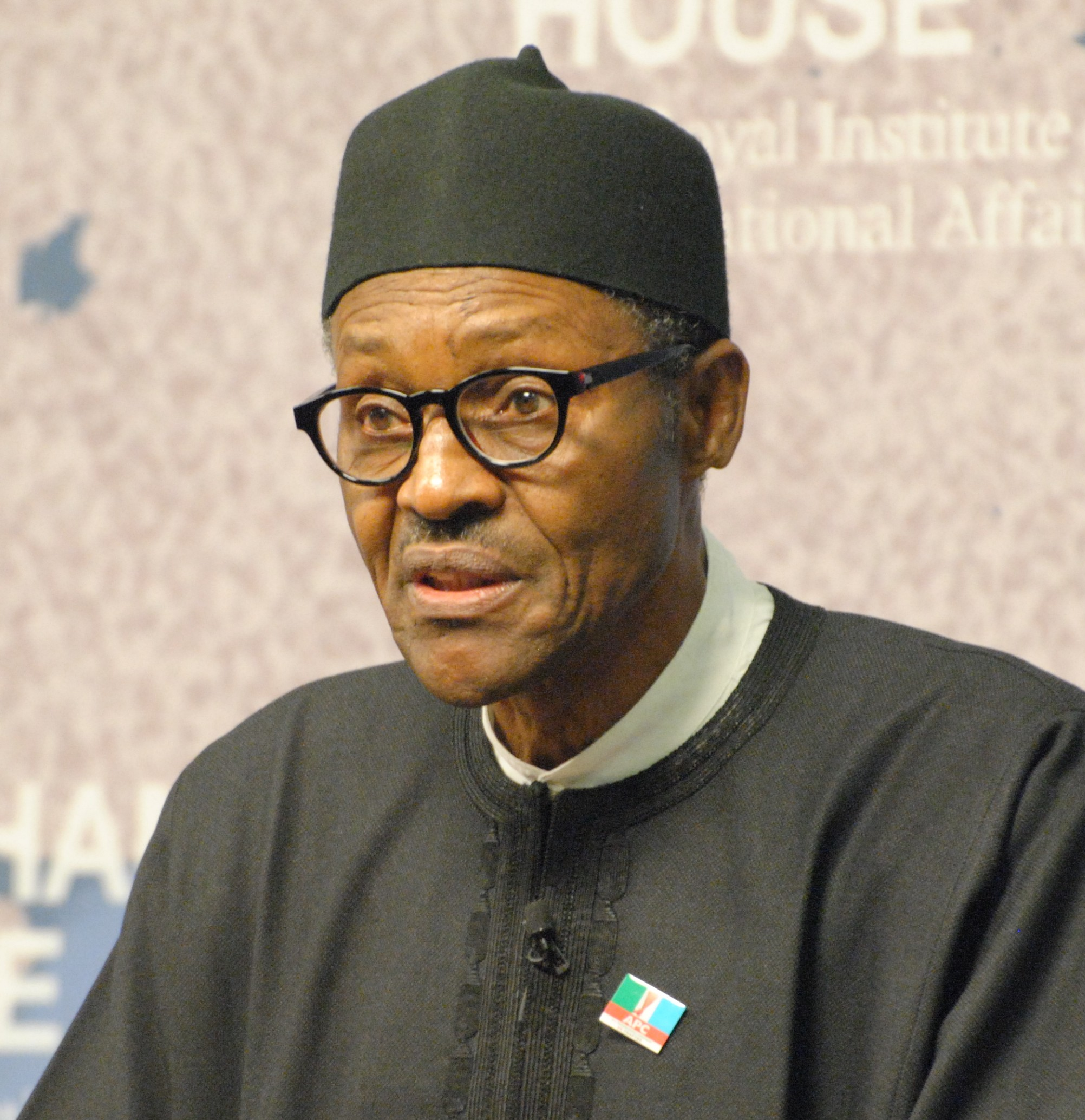
Nigeria
Muhammadu Buhari, President

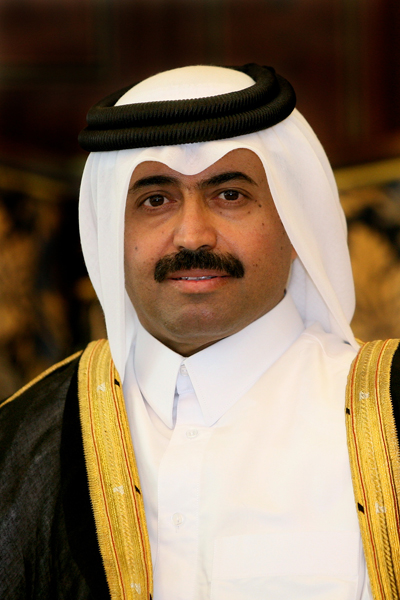
Qatar
Mohammed Bin Saleh Al-Sada, Minister of Energy and Industry

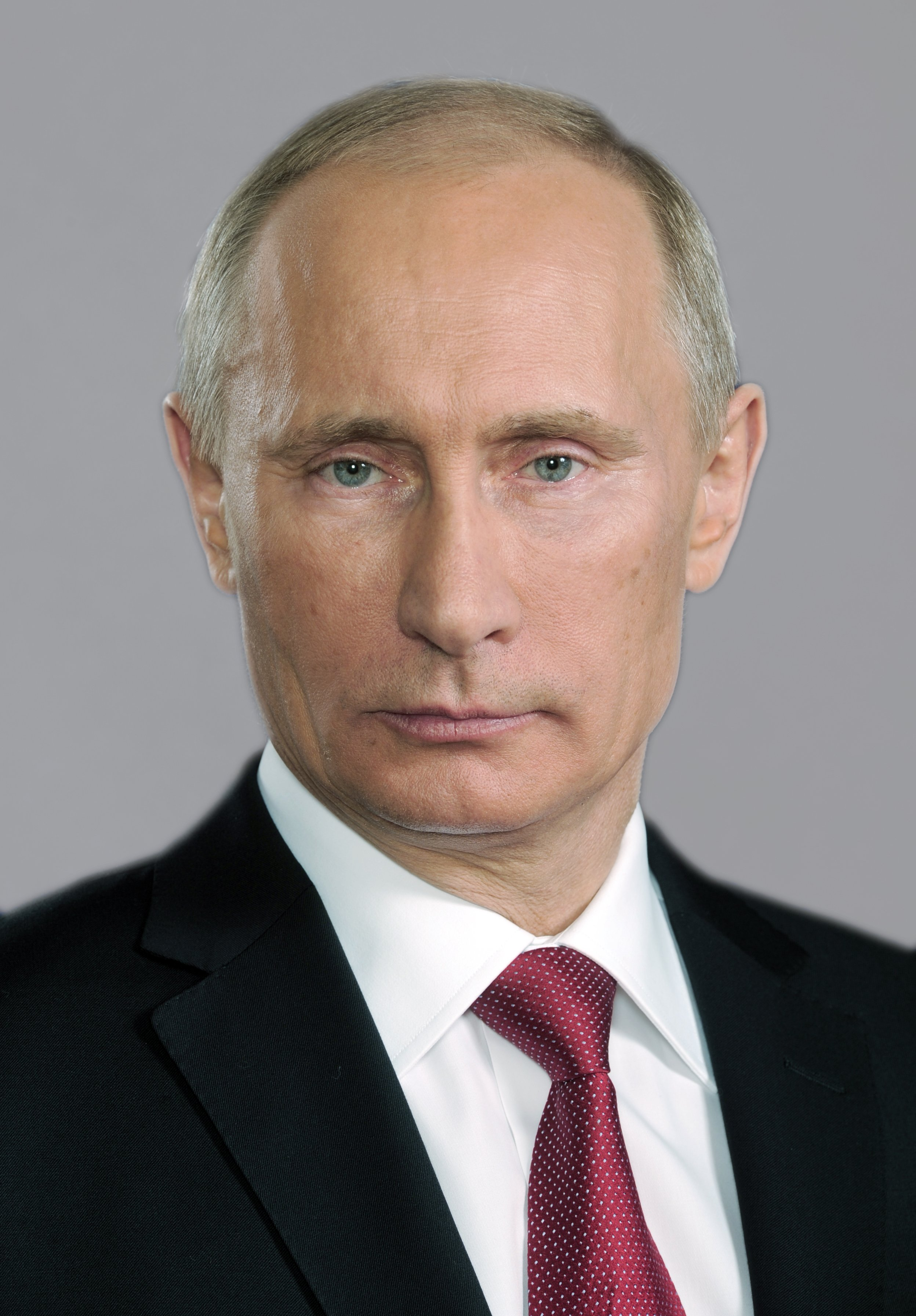
Russia
Vladimir Putin, President

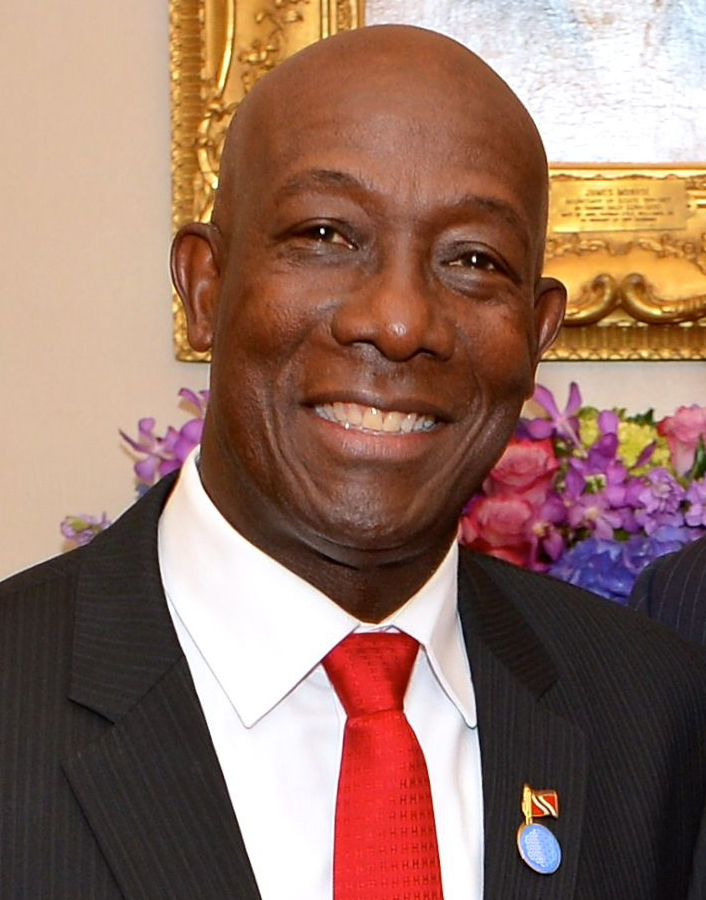
Trinidad and Tobago
Keith Rowley, Prime Minister

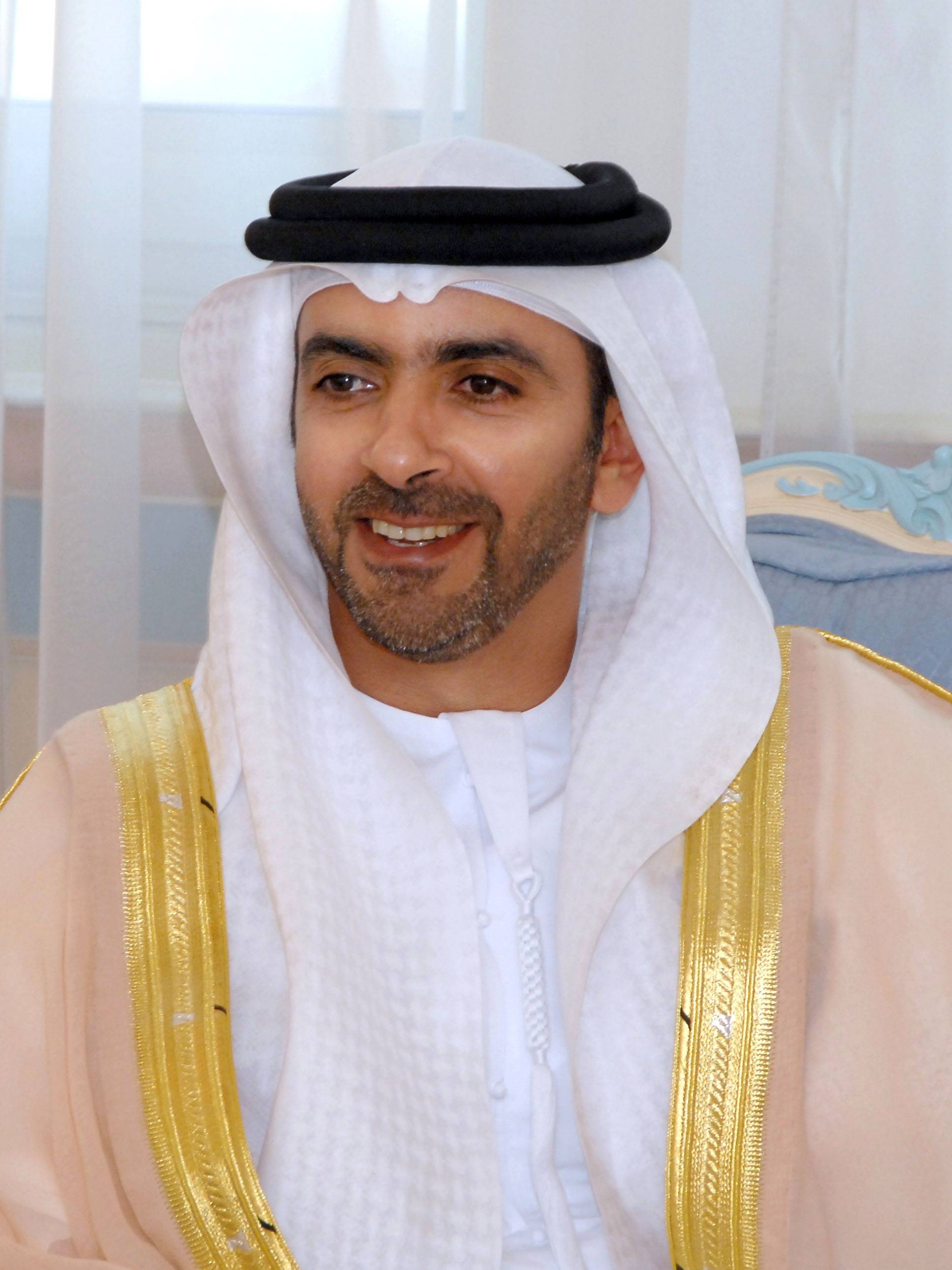
United Arab Emirates
Saif bin Zayed Al Nahyan, Deputy Prime Minister

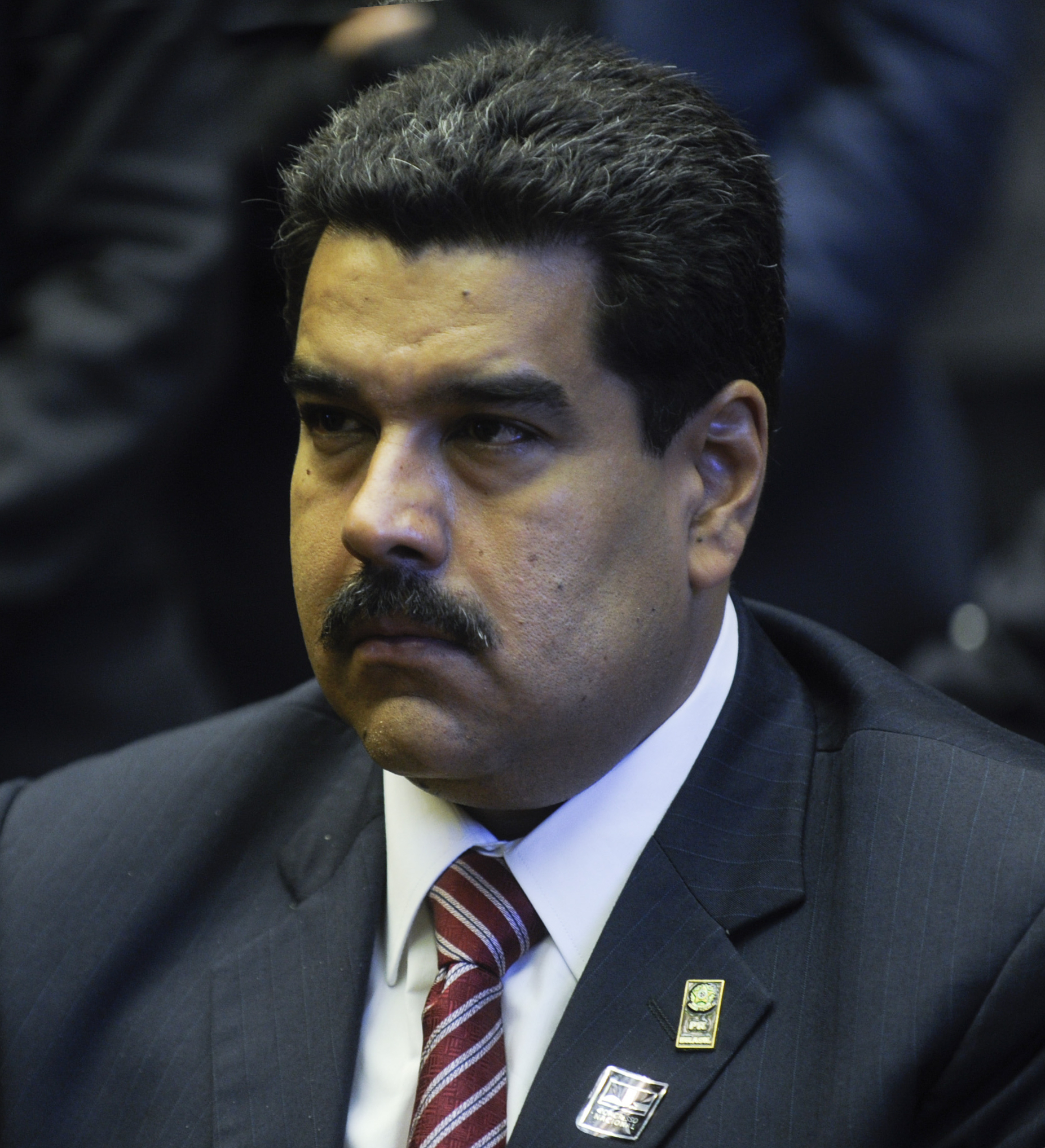
Venezuela
Nicolás Maduro, President

Observer members:

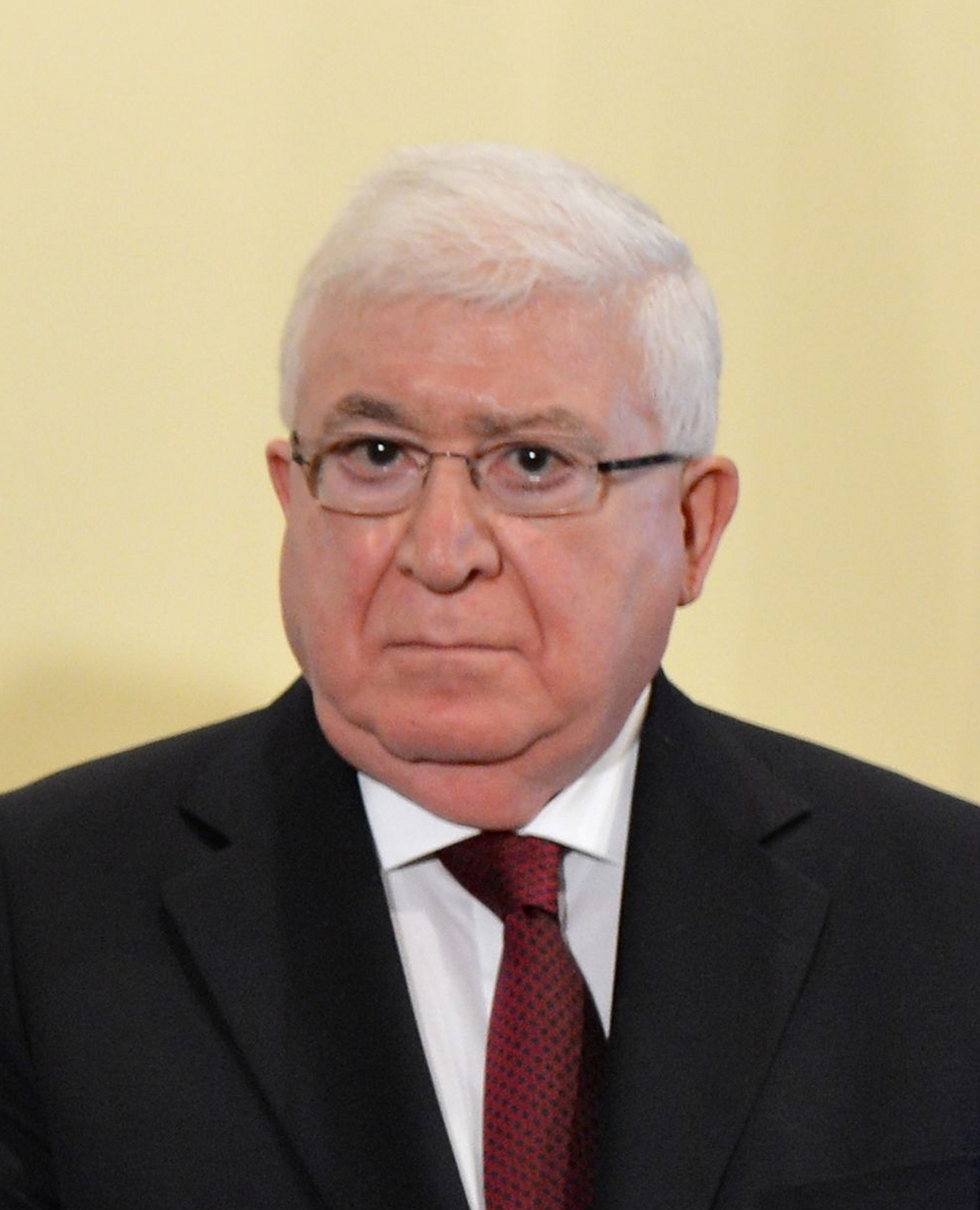
Iraq
Fuad Masum, President

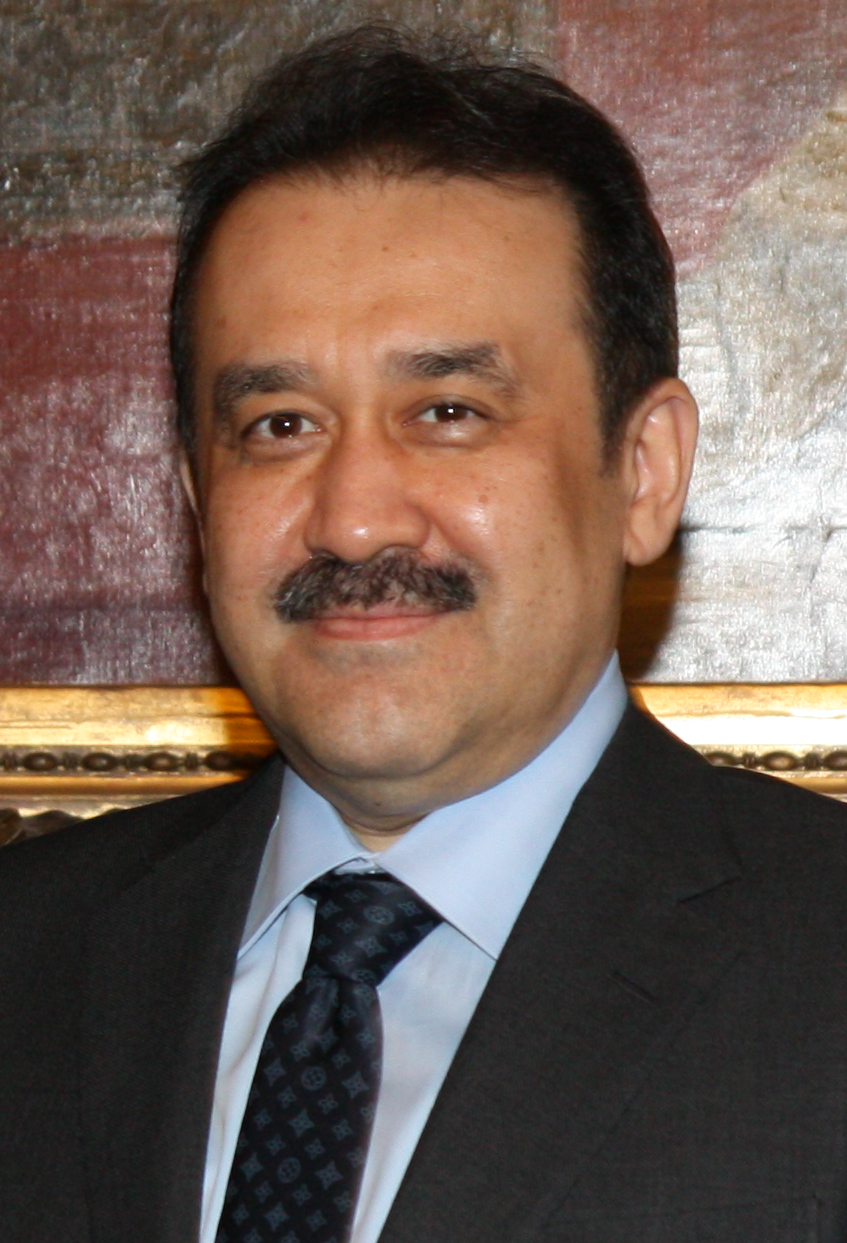
Kazakhstan
Karim Massimov, Prime Minister

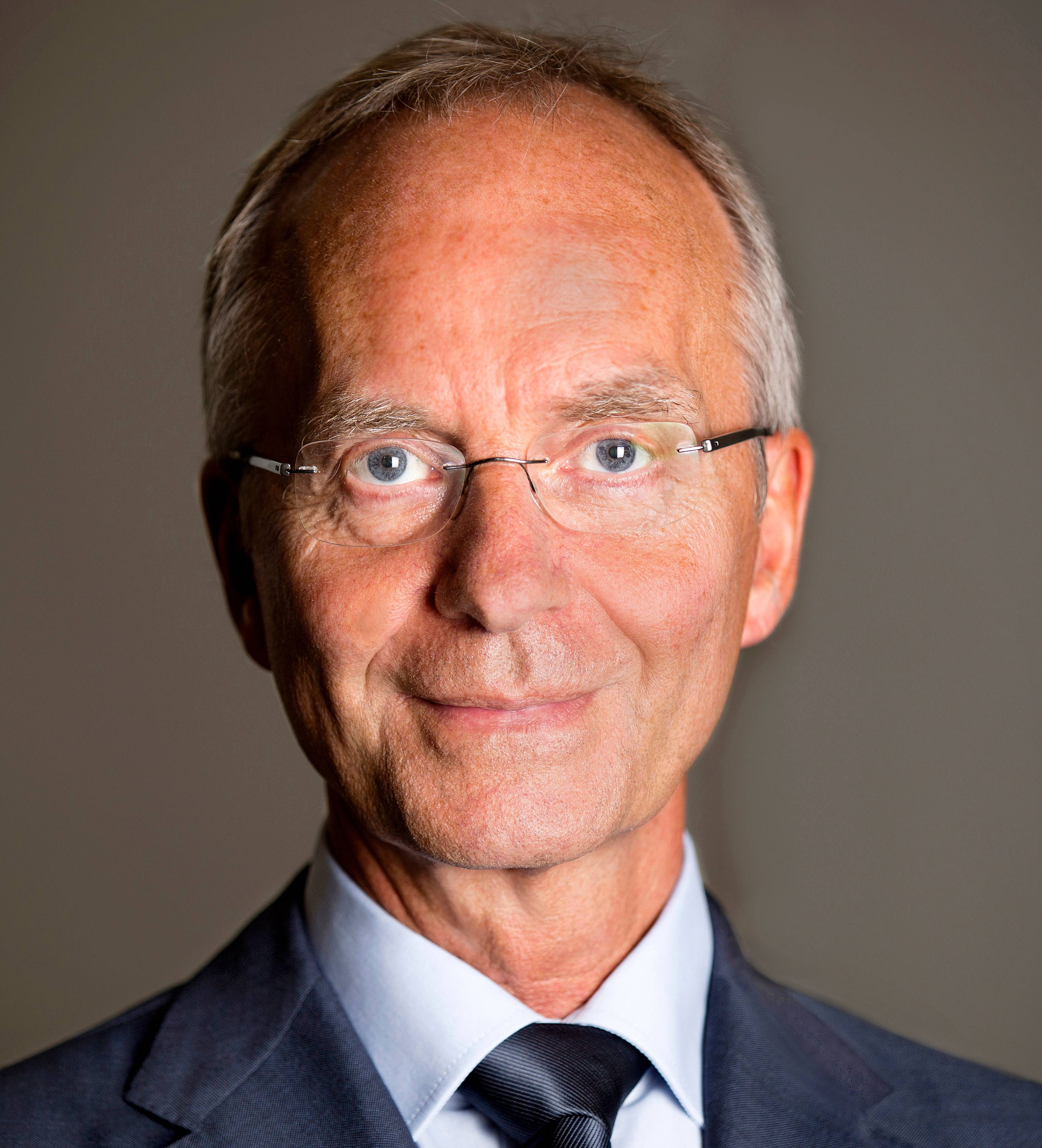
Netherlands
Henk Kamp, Minister of Economic Affairs

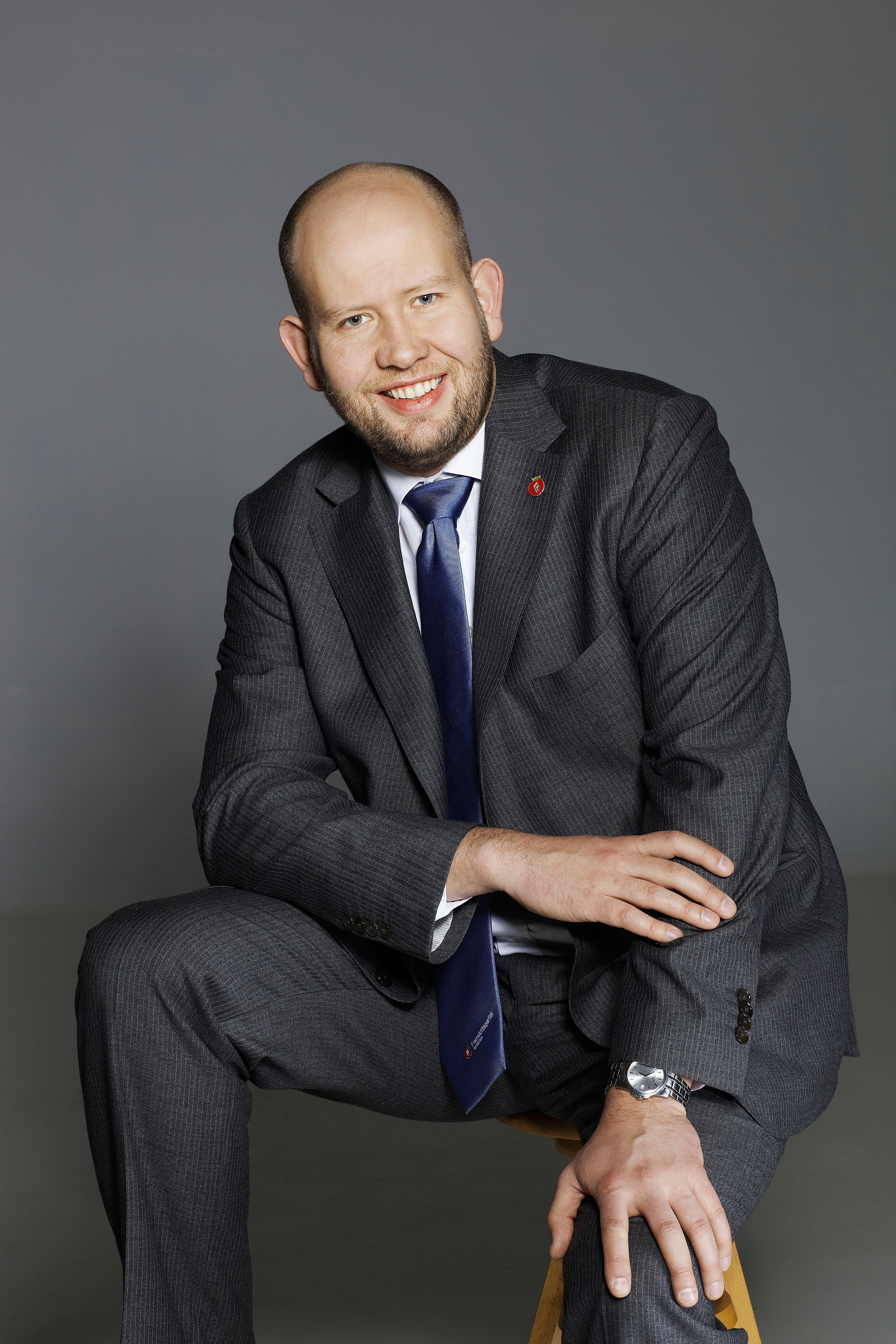
Norway
Tord Lien, Minister of Petroleum and Energy

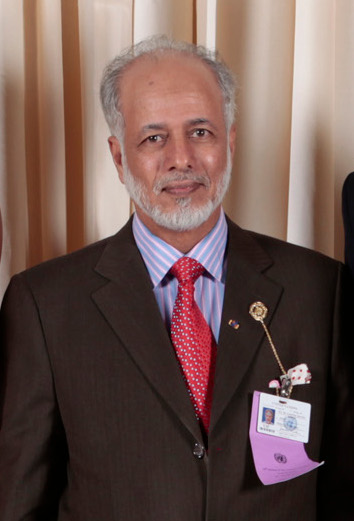
Oman
Yusuf bin Alawi bin Abdullah, Minister of Foreign Affairs

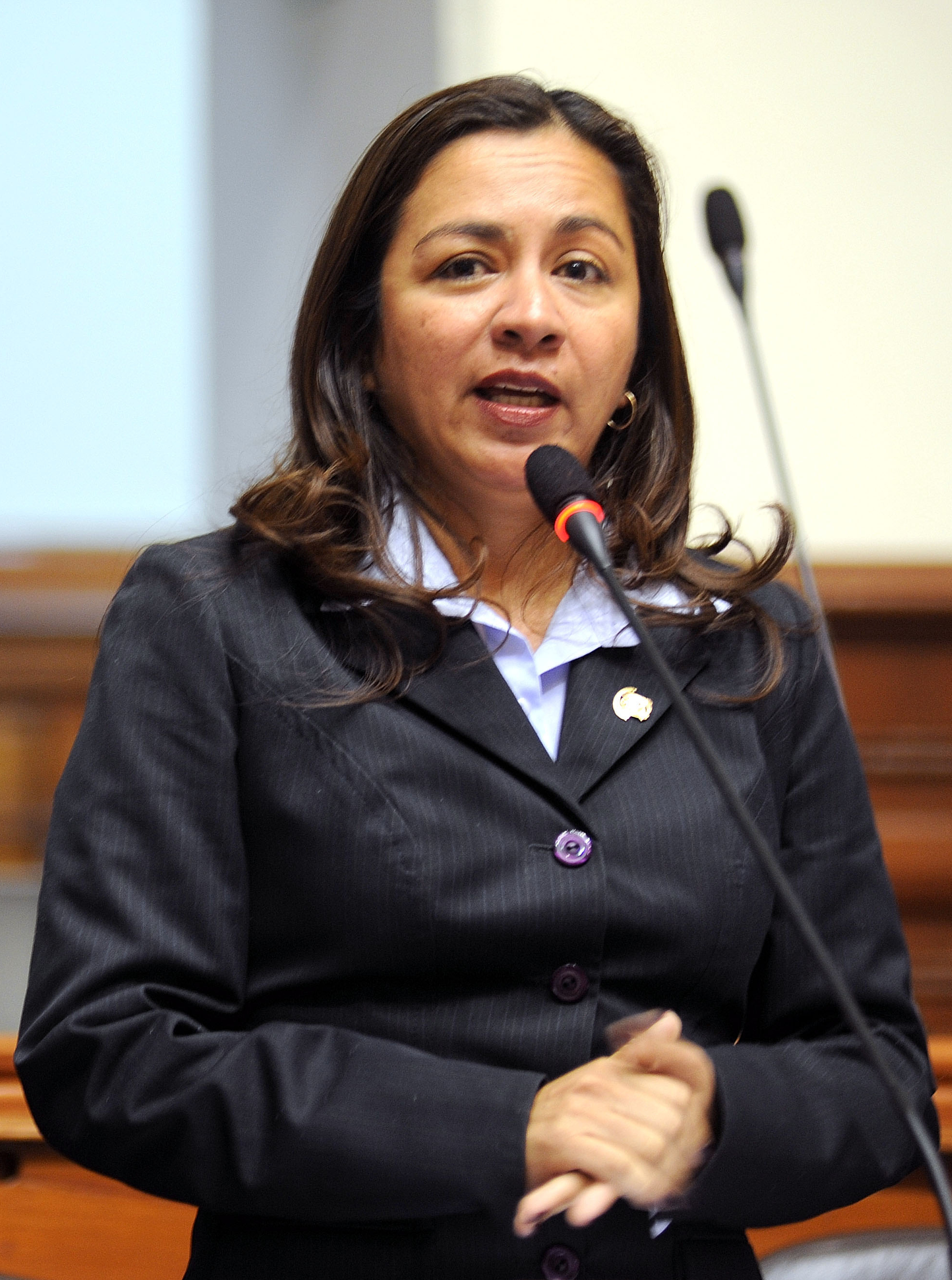
Peru
Marisol Espinoza, Vice President

Special Guest:

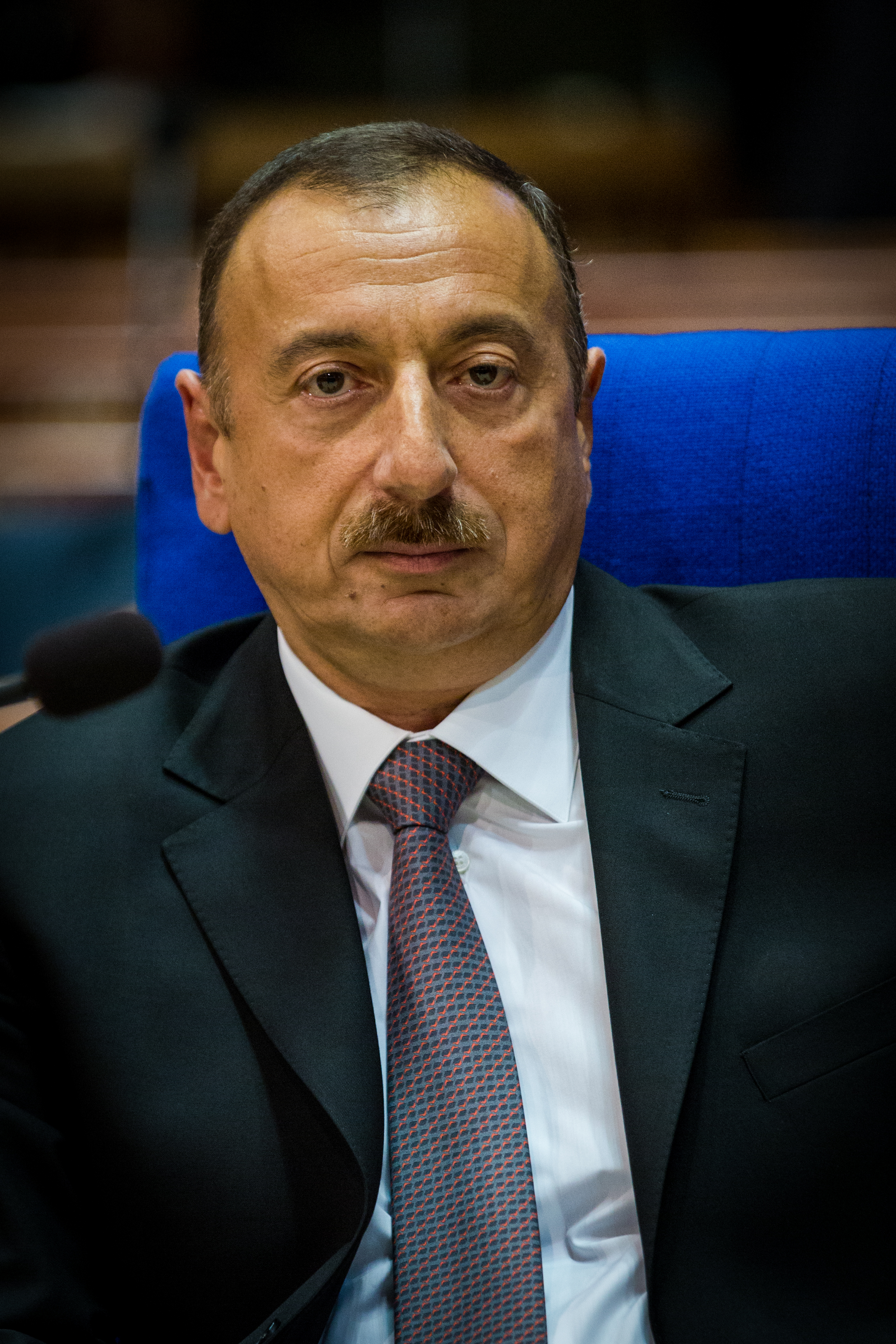
Azerbaijan
Ilham Aliyev, President

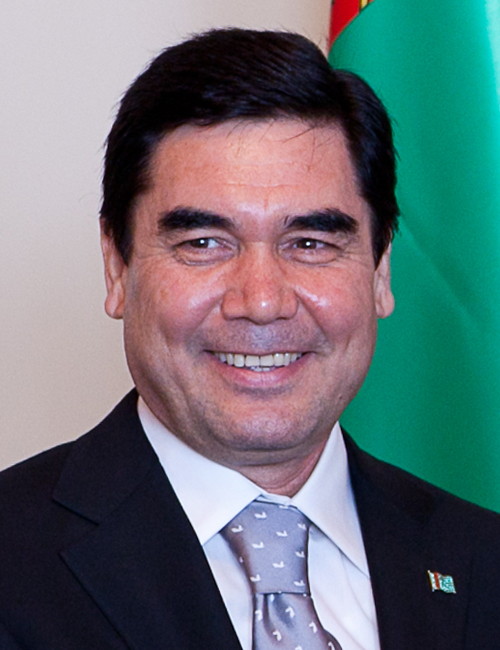
Turkmenistan
Gurbanguly Berdimuhamedow, President

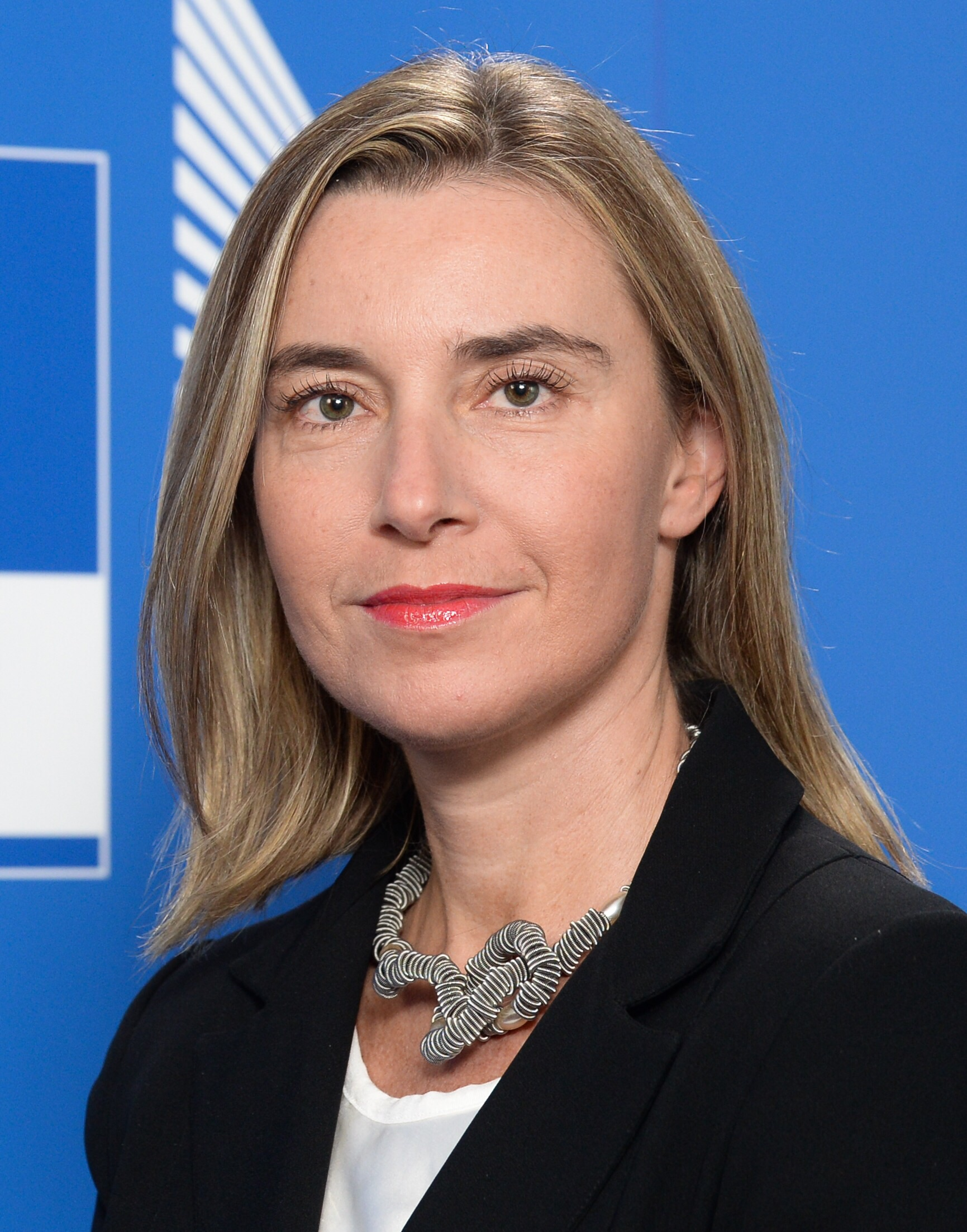
European Union
Federica Mogherini, High Representative

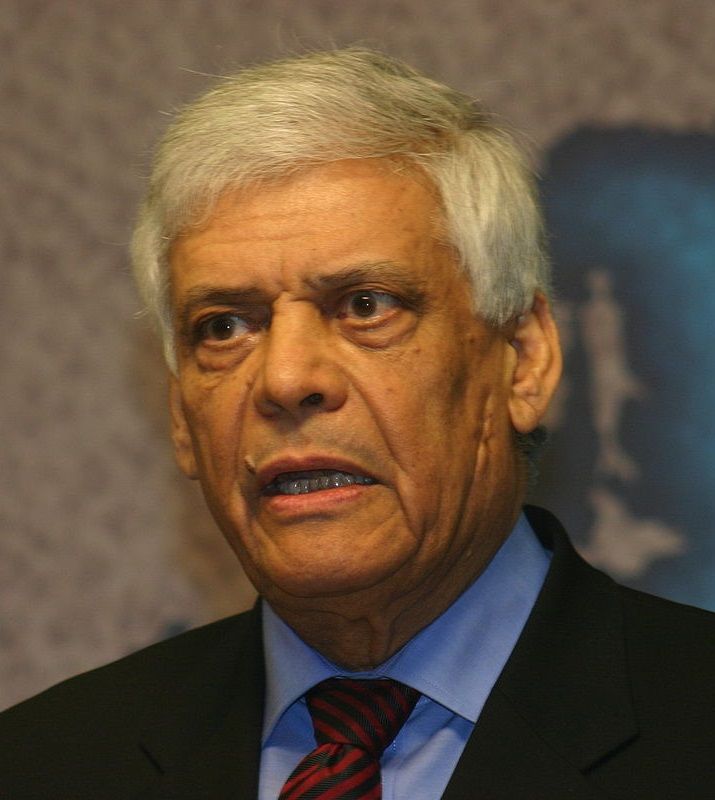
OPEC
Abdallah Salem el-Badri, Secretary General

== Final communique ==
The final communique underscored the need for stronger cooperation, including the transfer of expertise and pricing mechanisms. It also called for cooperation in the security of natural gas supplies to the global markets. It further objected to the application of extraterritorial laws, regulations and economic sanctions within the sector against the GECF member states.

== Bilateral meetings ==
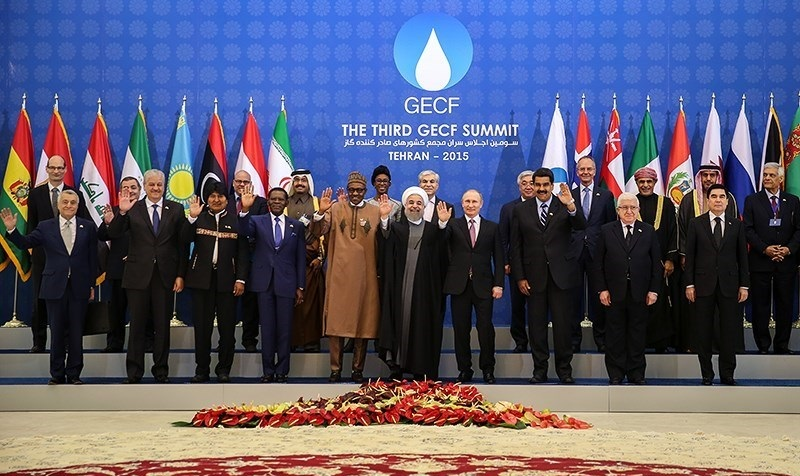
Leaders at the summit

Russian President Vladimir Putin met Iranian Supreme Leader Ayatollah Ali Khamenei. The two discussed "issues in bilateral relations, including atomic energy, oil and gas, and military-technical cooperation," according to his Putin's foreign policy aide, Yuri Ushakov. Putin also met Iranian President Hassan Rouhani.

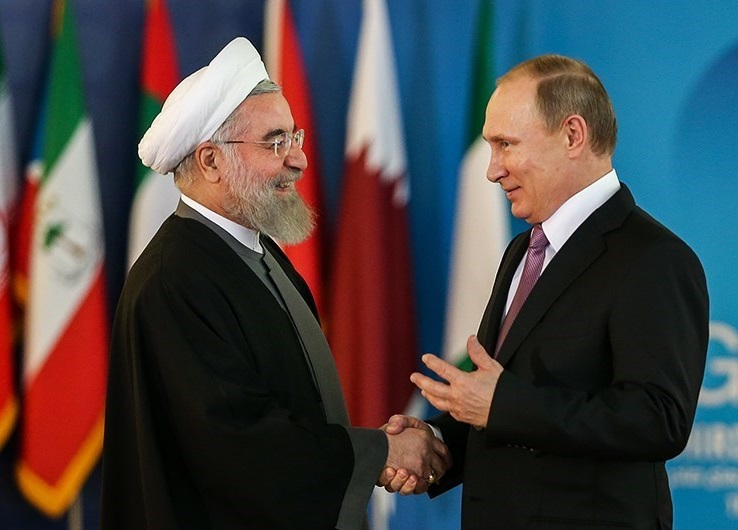
Iranian President Hassan Rouhani speaking with Russian President Vladimir Putin before the summit
